= Panmure =

Panmure may refer to:

== Places ==
- Panmure (New Zealand electorate), a former New Zealand Parliamentary electorate
- Panmure, New Zealand, a suburb of Auckland
- Panmure, Victoria, Australia
- Panmure Island, Prince Edward Island, Canada
- A rural community in the West Carleton-March Ward of Ottawa, Ontario, Canada

== People ==
- Baron Panmure, a title in the Peerage of the United Kingdom
- Earl of Panmure, a title in the Peerage of Scotland and Ireland
- Lord Panmure (Fox Maule-Ramsay; 1801–1874), British politician

== Infrastructure ==
- Fort Panmure, a fort in modern-day Natchez, Mississippi
- Panmure Castle, ruined castle, seat of the Earls of Panmure
- Panmure railway station, Auckland, on the Eastern Line in New Zealand
- Panmure railway station, Victoria, closed 1981, on the Warrnambool line in Australia

== Other uses ==
- Panmure RFC, a Scottish rugby union side
