= William Maule, 1st Earl Panmure =

Scottish soldier and politician

The Right Honourable General William Maule
- Earl Panmure
- Coat of arms
- Tenure: 1743–1782
- Predecessor: New creation
- Successor: Extinct
- Born: 1700
- Died: 4 January 1782 (aged 81–82)
- Father: Hon. Henry Maule

General William Maule, 1st Earl Panmure (1700–4 January 1782) was a Scottish soldier and politician who sat in the House of Commons for 47 years from 1735 to 1782.

== Life ==
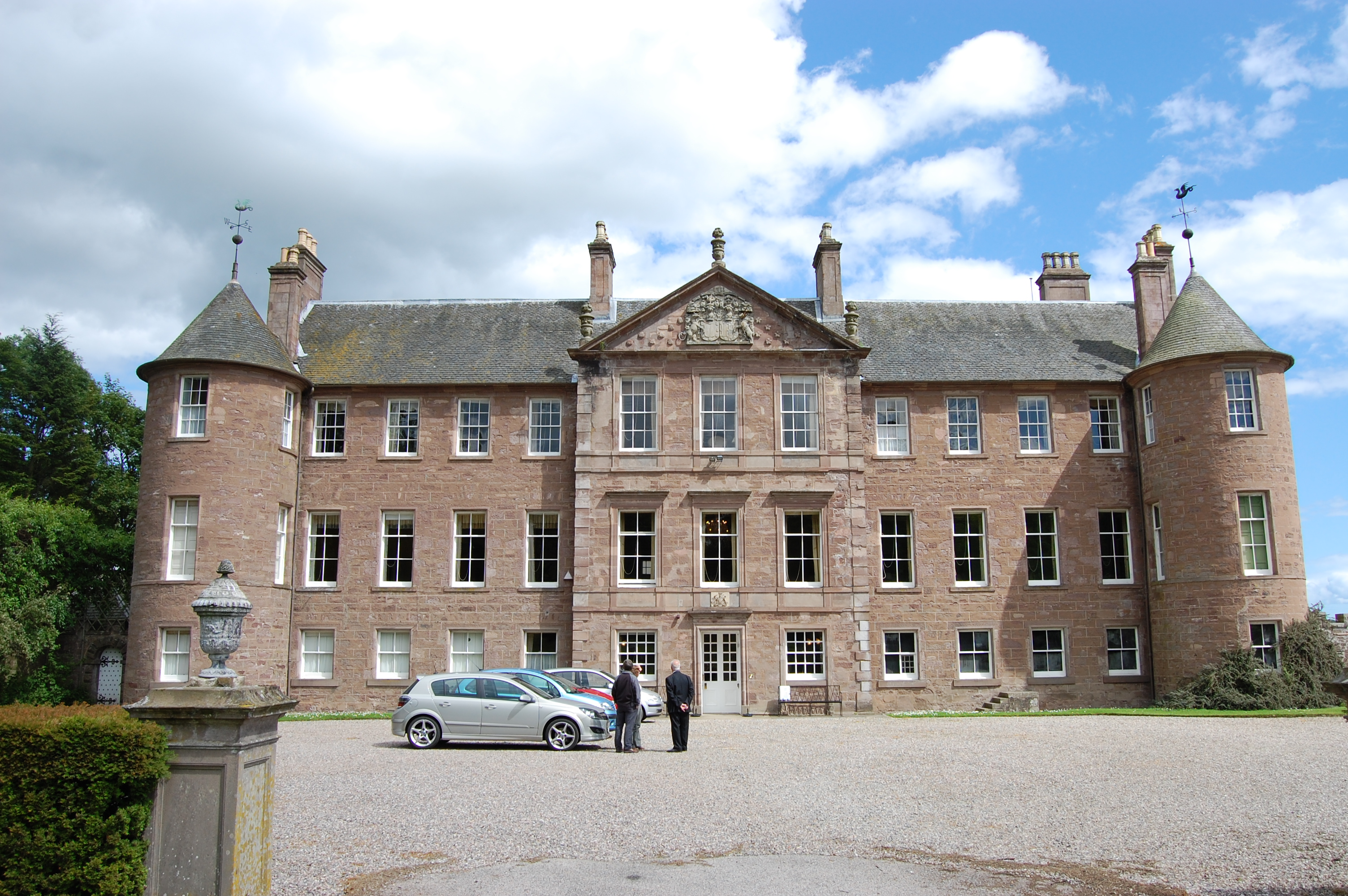
Brechin Castle, seat of the Maule Family

Maule was raised in France by his father the Honourable Henry Maule, younger brother of James Maule, 4th Earl of Panmure and was educated at Leyden (1718) and at the Scots College in Paris (1719). His father had fled to France with his brother James after the failed Jacobite rising of 1715.

He returned to Scotland following the general pardon of 1719 and enlisted as an ensign in the 1st Foot in October 1727. He became a captain in the 25th Foot in 1737, and a captain and lieutenant-colonel in the 3rd Foot Guards in 1741. He was promoted major in 1745 and colonel of the army in 1745. He was appointed Colonel of the 25th Foot in 1747, transferring as Colonel to the 21st Foot in 1752. Further promotion followed to major-general in 1755, lieutenant-general in 1758 and full general on 13 April 1770. He was finally appointed Colonel of the Royal Scots Greys in November 1770, a position he held until his death.

In 1742 he acquired Braikie Castle between Brechin and Arbroath.

He bought back the family estate of Brechin Castle, Forfar and was created Baron Maule, Viscount Maule and Earl Panmure in the Peerage of Ireland in 1743, his uncle's earldom having been forfeit by attainder in 1716. From 1735 to 1782 he represented Forfarshire in Parliament. Lord Panmure had no children and, on his death, his estates were divided between a cousin George Ramsay, 8th Earl of Dalhousie, and George's second son, William.

Parliament of Great Britain
Preceded by Lord Glamis	Member of Parliament for Forfarshire; 1735–1782	Succeeded by Archibald Douglas
Military offices
Preceded by The Duke of Argyll	Colonel of the 2nd (Royal North British) Regiment of Dragoons; 1770–1782	Succeeded by George Preston
Preceded by John Campbell	Colonel of the 21st Regiment of Foot (Royal North British Fuzileers); 1752–1770	Succeeded by Hon. Alexander Mackay
Preceded by John Lindsay, 20th Earl of Crawford	Colonel of the Earl of Leven's, or Edinburgh, Regiment of Foot); 1747–1752	Succeeded by William Home, 8th Earl of Home
Peerage of Ireland
New creation	Earl Panmure; 1743–1782	Extinct
