= Simon Ramsay, 16th Earl of Dalhousie =

British politician (1914–1999)

The Right Honourable The Earl of Dalhousie KT GCVO GBE MC DL
- Ramsay in the 1960s

2nd Governor-General of the Federation of Rhodesia and Nyasaland
- In office 8 October 1957 – May 1963
- Monarch: Elizabeth II
- Prime Minister: Roy Welensky
- Preceded by: The Lord Llewellin
- Succeeded by: Humphrey Gibbs (acting)

Member of the House of Lords
- Lord Temporal
- Hereditary peerage 1950–1999
- Preceded by: The 15th Earl of Dalhousie
- Succeeded by: The 17th Earl of Dalhousie

Member of Parliament for Forfarshire
- In office 1945–1950

Personal details
- Born: 17 October 1914
- Died: 15 July 1999 (aged 84)
- Party: Scottish Unionist
- Spouse: Margaret Stirling (m. 1940; died 1997)
- Children: 5, including James and Sarah
- Parent: Arthur Ramsay (father)

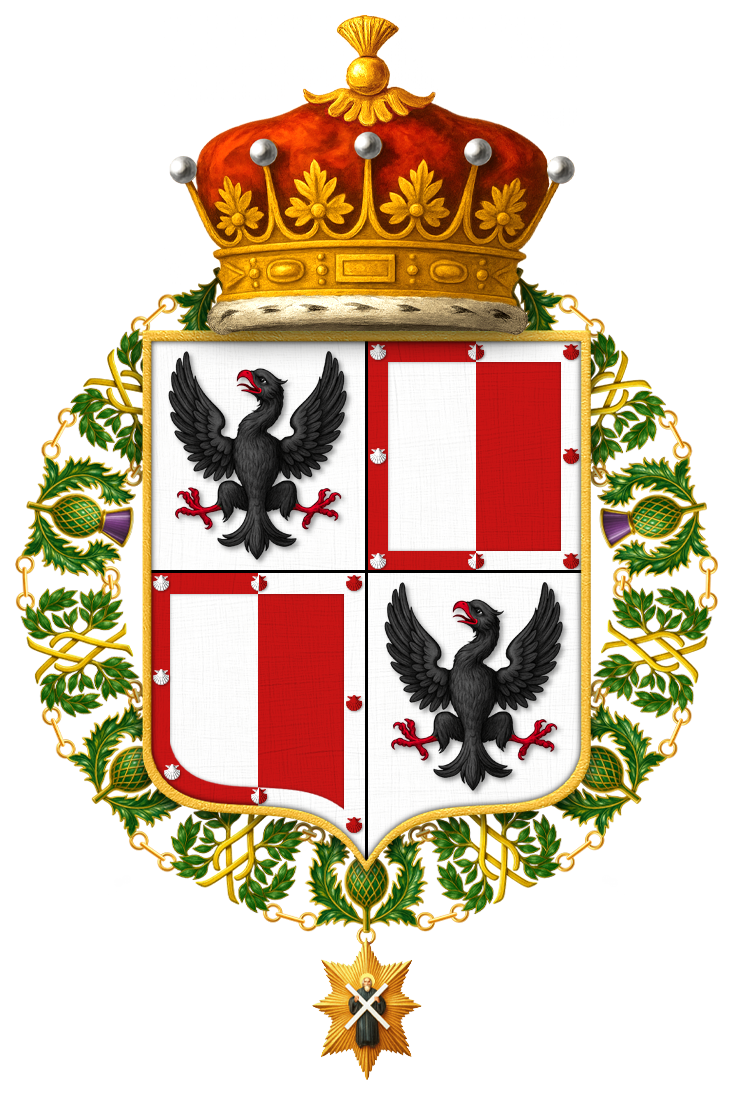
Shield of Arms of Simon Ramsay, 16th Earl of Dalhousie, KT, GCVO, GBE, MC, DL

Simon Ramsay, 16th Earl of Dalhousie, KT, GCVO, GBE, MC, DL (17 October 1914 – 15 July 1999), styled The Honourable Simon Ramsay between 1928 and 1950, was a British land owner, Scottish Unionist Party politician and colonial governor.

== Background and education ==
Ramsay was educated at Eton and Christ Church, Oxford. He served in the Black Watch during the Second World War, gaining the rank of Major, and was awarded the Military Cross for bravery during the Allied invasion of Sicily. In 1950 he inherited the title after his older brother, John Gilbert Ramsay, the 15th Earl, died without marrying.

== Public life ==
In 1945, Ramsay was elected as the Unionist Member of Parliament for Forfarshire and served until 1950 when he succeeded as Earl of Dalhousie and Chief of Clan Ramsay on the death of his brother. Between 1946 and 1948 he served as a Conservative whip. He was appointed Governor-General of the Federation of Rhodesia and Nyasaland in 1957, and served until 1963 when the federation broke up, with Northern Rhodesia and Nyasaland becoming independent Zambia and Malawi respectively while Southern Rhodesia returned to its status as a self-governing colony.

He refused to renew his commission with the Colonial Service after being forced to read the controversial 1963 speech from the throne prepared by Sir Roy Welensky who was highly critical of Prime Minister Harold Macmillan's policies to gradually end White rule in the Federation of Rhodesia and Nyasaland. Shortly after he left politics altogether and retired to his estate. Ironically, he disliked politics and never made his maiden speech in the House of Lords, only taking his place in 1978.

In 1953, Dalhousie was awarded an honorary degree by Dalhousie University in Nova Scotia, which had been founded in 1818 by the 9th Earl. He served as Lord Chamberlain to Queen Elizabeth the Queen Mother (1965–1992), Lord-Lieutenant of Angus (1967–1989) and Chancellor of the University of Dundee (1977–92), with the institution naming a significant building after him in September 2008.

He was a Lieutenant of the Royal Company of Archers, the monarch's bodyguard in Scotland and was created a Knight of the Order of the Thistle by Queen Elizabeth II in 1971.

== Family ==
Lord Dalhousie married Margaret Stirling of Keir (4 July 1914 – 9 February 1997), daughter of Brigadier-General Archibald Stirling of Keir, a Member of Parliament, and a granddaughter maternally of the 13th Lord Lovat, in June 1940. They had three sons and two daughters. His third child and eldest son, James, inherited the title upon his death.

- Lady Elizabeth Anne Ramsay (16 September 1941 – 10 December 2025), married Richard Lumley, 12th Earl of Scarbrough on 9 July 1970. They have four children and one granddaughter.
- Lady Sarah Mary Ramsay (18 October 1945), married Sir John Chippendale Lindley Keswick on 23 April 1966. They have three sons and five grandchildren.
- James Hubert Ramsay, 17th Earl of Dalhousie (17 January 1948), married Marilyn Butter on 3 October 1973. They have three children and five grandsons:
  - Lady Lorna Theresa Ramsay (6 February 1975) she married Fergus Lefebvre on 12 November 2005. They have three sons.
  - Lady Alice Magdalene Ramsay (10 August 1977) she is married to Michael Dickinson. They have one son.
  - Simon David Ramsay, Lord Ramsay (18 April 1981) he married Kaitlin Kubinsky on 24 September 2016. They have one son.
- Hon. Anthony Ramsay (2 March 1949), married Georgina Astor on 3 November 1973, divorced in 1979. They have one son and one grandson. He remarried Vilma Salcedo in 1984. They have two daughters.
  - Alexander Simon Ramsay (12 January 1977), married Caroline Taylor, daughter of Jonathan Taylor. They have one son.
  - Zoë Mary Ramsay (1984)
  - Isabella Ramsay (1986)
- Hon. John Patrick Ramsay (b. 9 August 1952), married Louisa Jane d'Abo on 25 July 1981. They have two children:
  - Christopher Ramsay (18 February 1984)
  - Lucy Emma Ramsay (1985)

Parliament of the United Kingdom
Preceded by William Thomas Shaw	Member of Parliament for Forfar; 1945–1950	Constituency abolished
Court offices
Preceded by The 12th Earl of Airlie	Lord Chamberlain to Queen Elizabeth the Queen Mother; 1965–1992	Succeeded by The Earl of Crawford
Honorary titles
Preceded by The 12th Earl of Airlie	Lord Lieutenant of Angus; 1967–1989	Succeeded by The 13th Earl of Airlie
Academic offices
Preceded by Queen Elizabeth the Queen Mother	Chancellor of the University of Dundee; 1977–1992	Succeeded by Sir James Black
Peerage of Scotland
Preceded by John Gilbert Ramsay	Earl of Dalhousie; 1950–1999	Succeeded by James Ramsay
