= Mount Dalhousie =

Mountain in the country of Canada

Coordinates: 52.613°N 116.942°W

Mount Dalhousie is a summit in Jasper National Park in Alberta, Canada.

Mount Dalhousie was named in tribute to the Earl of Dalhousie.
