= Baron Panmure =

Extinct barony in the Peerage of the United Kingdom

Baron Panmure, of Brechin and Navar in the County of Forfar, was a title in the Peerage of the United Kingdom. The barony was created on 10 September 1831 for the Hon. William Maule, longtime Member of Parliament for Forfar. On the death of William Ramsay in 1852 the title passed to his eldest son Fox Maule-Ramsay, and became extinct in 1874 on his death.

== History ==
When the barony was created for William Maule, it was met with some hostility due to his "bad character". Born William Ramsay, he was the second son of George Ramsay, 8th Earl of Dalhousie, second son of George Ramsay, Lord Ramsay, by his wife Jean, daughter of the Hon. Harry Maule of Kelly, younger son of George Maule, 2nd Earl of Panmure, and brother of James Maule, 4th Earl of Panmure (who took part in the Jacobite Rebellion of 1715 and was attainted in 1716 with his titles forfeited) (see Earl of Dalhousie and Earl of Panmure for earlier history of the family). In 1782 he succeeded to the Maule estates on the death of his great-uncle William Maule, 1st Earl Panmure, and assumed by royal licence the same year the additional surname and arms of Maule. In 1831 the Panmure title was revived when he was raised to the peerage. He was succeeded by his eldest son, the second Baron. He was a prominent Liberal politician. In 1860 he succeeded his first cousin as eleventh Earl of Dalhousie and assumed the same year the additional surname of Ramsay. He was childless and on his death in 1874 the barony of Panmure became extinct, while he was succeeded in the earldom of Dalhousie by his first cousin. This title is still extant.

The Hon. Lauderdale Maule, second son of the first Baron, also represented Forfar in the House of Commons.

== Barons Panmure (1831) ==
- William Maule, 1st Baron Panmure (1771–1852)
- Fox Maule-Ramsay, 2nd Baron Panmure (1801–1874) (succeeded as Earl of Dalhousie in 1860)

== See also ==
- Earl of Panmure
