= Clan Ramsay =

Lowland Scottish clan

- Ramsaidh
- Crest: A unicorn's head couped Argent armed Or
- Motto: Ora et Labora (Latin for 'Pray and Work')

Profile
- Region: Lowlands
- District: Midlothian
- Plant badge: Blue harebell

Chief
- The Rt. Hon. James Hubert Ramsay
- The 17th Earl of Dalhousie
- Seat: Brechin Castle
- Historic seat: Dalhousie Castle
Clan branches
Ramsays of Dalhousie
Ramsays of Auchterhouse
Ramsays of Banff
Ramsays of Forfar
Ramsays of Clatto
Rival clans
Clan Douglas

Clan Ramsay is a Lowland Scottish clan.

== History ==
=== Origins of the clan ===
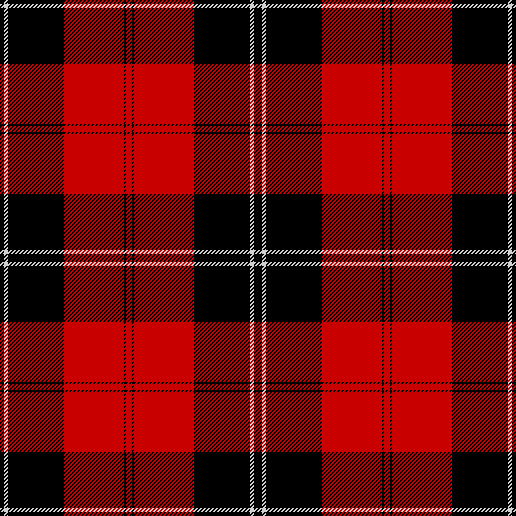
Ramsay tartan as illustrated in the Vestiarium Scoticum of 1842.

In the eleventh century a ram in the sea is believed to have been an emblem on the seal of an abbey in Huntingdon. In 1124, David of Scotland, Earl of Huntingdon was accompanied by many young Norman noblemen. Amongst these nobles may have been Symon de Ramesie. Symon was granted lands in Midlothian from David and also witnessed an important charter to the monks of Holyrood Abbey in 1140.

=== 13th century and branches of the clan ===
By the 13th century there were five major branches of the Clan Ramsay: the Ramsays of Dalhousie, the Ramsays of Auchterhouse, the Ramsays of Banff, the Ramsay of Forfar and the Ramsays of Clatto. In 1255, during the minority of Alexander III of Scotland, William de Ramsay of Dalhousie was a member of the king's council.

=== Wars of Scottish Independence ===
During the Wars of Scottish Independence, William Ramsay appears on the Ragman Rolls of 1296, swearing fealty to Edward I of England. However Ramsay later declared for Robert the Bruce and was one of the signatories on the Declaration of Arbroath. Ramsay had two sons, William and Alexander. The latter was a renowned knight and in 1342 was made sheriff of Teviotdale. However this office was claimed by the Douglases who became jealous and William Douglas, Lord of Liddesdale captured Alexander Ramsay with a strong force of men, imprisoning him in Hermitage Castle, where he was starved to death. Alexander's brother, William Ramsay, was captured by the English at the Battle of Neville's Cross but was not killed by them as he lived to tell the tale.

In 1400 another Sir Alexander Ramsay held out in Dalhousie Castle against a siege by the English, who were forced to retreat due to Ramsay's resolute resistance.

=== 16th century and Anglo-Scottish Wars ===
In 1513 during the Anglo-Scottish Wars, Sir Alexander's descendant, another Alexander Ramsay, was killed at the Battle of Flodden. Dalhousie then passed to his son, Nicolas, who was a staunch supporter of Mary, Queen of Scots. After Mary was defeated the Ramsays acknowledged her son as James VI of Scotland and the Ramsays were later rewarded for saving that monarch's life.

One of Nicolas's grandsons was John Ramsay who in 1600 killed both the Ruthven, Earl of Gowrie and his brother who were allegedly attempting to kidnap the king. This became known as the Gowrie Conspiracy. For saving the king, John Ramsay was created Earl of Holderness.

=== 17th century and Civil War ===
In 1618, the Earl of Holderness's brother, George Ramsay, was created Lord Ramsay. His eldest son, William Ramsay, opposed the religious politics of Charles I. During the Civil War, William raised a regiment of cavalry and fought at the Battle of Marston Moor. He was also part of Sir David Leslie's force at the Battle of Philiphaugh where the Marquis of Montrose was defeated. Ramsay had been created Earl of Dalhousie in 1633.

In 1666 Sir Gilbert Ramsay of Bamff, descended from Neis de Ramsay, physician to Alexander II of Scotland around 1232, was created a Baronet of Nova Scotia.

=== 18th and 19th centuries ===
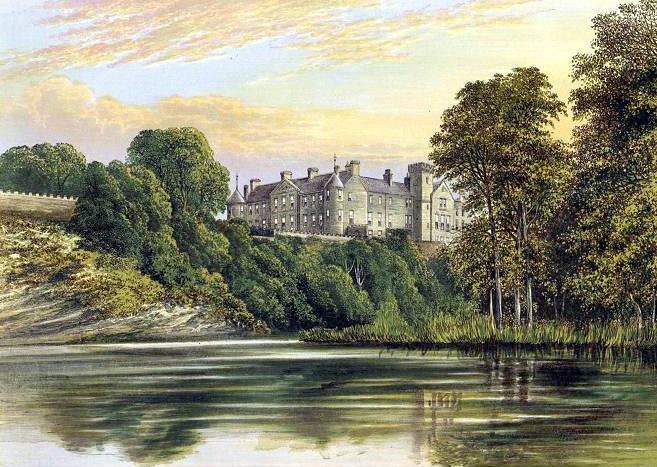
Brechin Castle circa 1880.

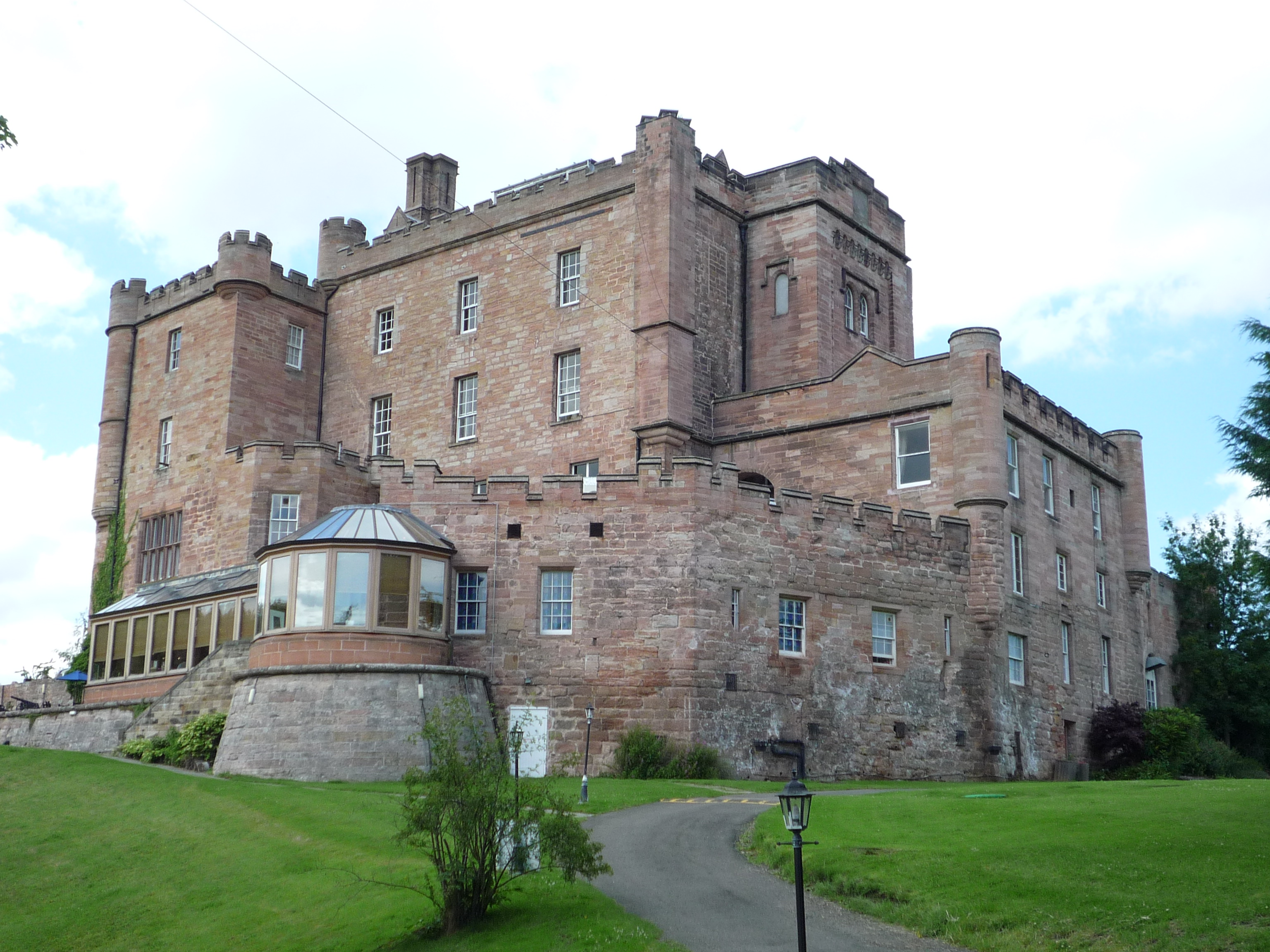
Dalhousie Castle.

The Ramsays served in all the great campaigns of the 18th and 19th centuries on the continent, in Canada, and in India. George Ramsay, 9th Earl of Dalhousie was Governor General of British North America from 1819 to 1828. He was also commander-in-chief of India from 1829 to 1832. His son was James Broun-Ramsay, 1st Marquess of Dalhousie who also served as Governor General of India, from 1847 to 1856. In 1849 he was created Marquess of Dalhousie but this title died with him in 1860. However the older earldom passed to a cousin from whom the present Earl descends.

Other branches of the family have also produced persons of distinction and rank. Alexander Ramsay, the younger son of the Arthur George Maule Ramsay, 14th Earl of Dalhousie married Princess Patricia of Connaught who was a granddaughter of Queen Victoria. Their son was Alexander Ramsay of Mar and his wife, the Lady Saltoun, chief of the Clan Fraser, are members of the royal family, by the Queen's personal wish.

Sir John Ramsay of Balmain was created Lord Bothwell in 1485. However he forfeited that title for treason in 1488 and it was later granted to the Clan Hepburn. The Ramsays of Balmain restored their fortunes by being created [baronet]s, first in 1625 and again in 1806.

=== Other achievements ===
Fighting was not the only talent of this family. Andrew Ramsay, better known as the Chevalier de Ramsay, left Scotland for France in 1708. His academic excellence was soon recognized, and he became mentor to the Prince de Turenne. The King of France appointed him a Knight of the Order of Saint Lazarus, and for a time he was tutor to both the Jacobite princes, Charles Edward Stuart and Henry Benedict Stuart. Allan Ramsay, the great 18th century poet, and his son, the distinguished portrait painter, were descended from the Clan Lairds of Cockpen, cadets of the chiefly house. Raymond Ramsay is a well-known 20th-century historian. Raymond was born in Manitoba and he is author of some books and articles about great Norman explorers of America. Raymond Ramsay wrote about Vinland and Norumbega etc. In 1972, Dalhousie Castle was converted to a hotel, and the clan seat became Brechin Castle in Angus.

One of the world's most successful chefs, Gordon Ramsay, belongs to the clan.

== Castles ==
- Brechin Castle is the current seat of the Earl of Dalhousie, chief of Clan Ramsay.
- Dalhousie Castle was the previous seat of the Earls of Dalhousie.

== Clan profile ==
=== Chief ===
The current chief of Clan Ramsay is Guy Paul Ramsay, 17th Earl of Dalhousie.

=== Symbols ===
Clan members may show their allegiance to their clan by wearing a crest badge and clan badge. Crest badges usually contain the chief's heraldic crest and motto which are encircled by a strap and buckle. The crest and motto within the badge are the heraldic property of the clan chief alone. By wearing such crest badges, clan members show their allegiance to their chief. The crest badge suitable for a member of Clan Ramsay contains the crest: A unicorn's head couped Argent armed Or, and the motto ORA ET LABORA (from Latin: "pray and work"). Another clan symbol is the clan badge, or plant badge. These badges consist merely of sprigs of a specific plant, sometimes worn behind the crest badge on a bonnet. The clan badge of Clan Ramsay is Blue Harebell.

The most popular of the tartans attributed to the surname Ramsay is derived from one titled Ramsey in the Vestiarium Scoticum published in 1842. Though the Vestiarium has been proven to be a Victorian era hoax many of today's clan tartans are derived from it. The Vestiarium provides both an illustrative plate, and a written description of the sett, however the plate and description contradict each other.

== See also ==
- Ramsay (surname) – famous Ramsays Ramsey
- Ramsay (Nordic branch)
- Brechin Castle
- Dalhousie Castle
- Bamff House
- Scottish clan
