= Arthur Ramsay, 14th Earl of Dalhousie =

Scottish peer and soldier (1878–1928)

The Right Honourable The Earl of Dalhousie
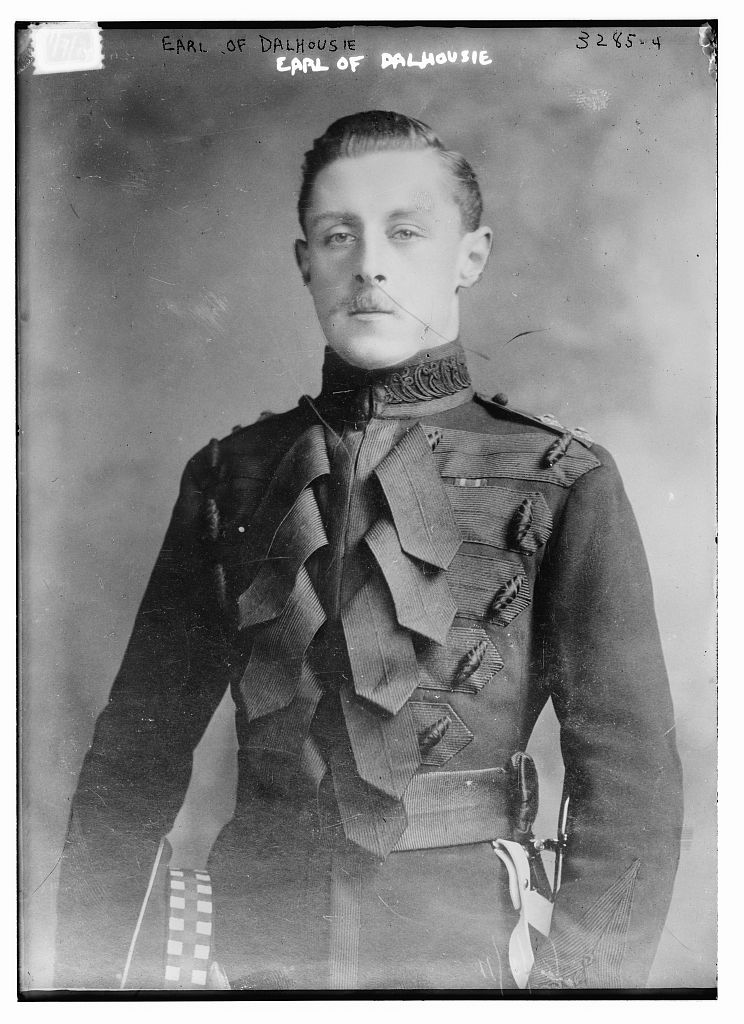
- The Earl of Dalhousie

Personal details
- Born: 4 September 1878 Torquay, Devon, England
- Died: 23 December 1928 (aged 50) Brechin, Angus, Scotland
- Spouse: Mary Heathcote-Drummond (m. 1903)
- Children: 4, including Simon
- Parent: John Ramsay (father)
- Relatives: Patrick Ramsay (brother); Alexander Ramsay (brother)
- Education: University College, Oxford
- Military career
- Rank: Captain
- Units: Forfar and Kincardine Artillery; Scots Guard
- Wars: Second Boer War; First World War

Arthur George Maule Ramsay, 14th Earl of Dalhousie JP (4 September 1878 – 23 December 1928), styled Lord Ramsay between 1880 and 1887, was a Scottish peer and soldier.

== Early life ==
Ramsay was born at Atkinson's Hotel, Torquay, Devon, the eldest of five sons of John Ramsay, 13th Earl of Dalhousie, and Lady Ida Louisa Bennet, daughter of Charles Bennet, 6th Earl of Tankerville. His brother Hon. Sir Patrick Ramsay (1879–1962) became a senior diplomat, and another brother was Admiral Hon. Sir Alexander Ramsay (1881–1972), a senior Royal Navy officer who married Princess Patricia of Connaught.

Lord Ramsay was educated at Eton College and the University College, Oxford. He succeeded in the earldom in 1887 on the death of his father.

== Military career ==
Lord Dalhousie obtained a commission as a 2nd Lieutenant in the Forfar and Kincardine Artillery, a Militia regiment, on 10 June 1897, and transferred to a Regular Army commission in the Scots Guards on 10 February 1900. Following the outbreak of the Second Boer War in late 1899, the 2nd Battalion Scots Guards was posted to South Africa as reinforcements in April 1900. He served there with the battalion until the end of the war, and was promoted a lieutenant on 14 December 1901. The war ended with the Peace of Vereeniging in June 1902, and Lord Dalhousie left Port Natal with other men of the 2nd battalion Scots Guards on the SS Michigan in late September 1902, arriving at Southampton in late October, when the battalion was posted to Aldershot.

He later fought as a captain in the First World War.

He was a Justice of the Peace for Forfarshire, and was commissioned a Deputy Lieutenant of the county in December 1901.

== Family ==
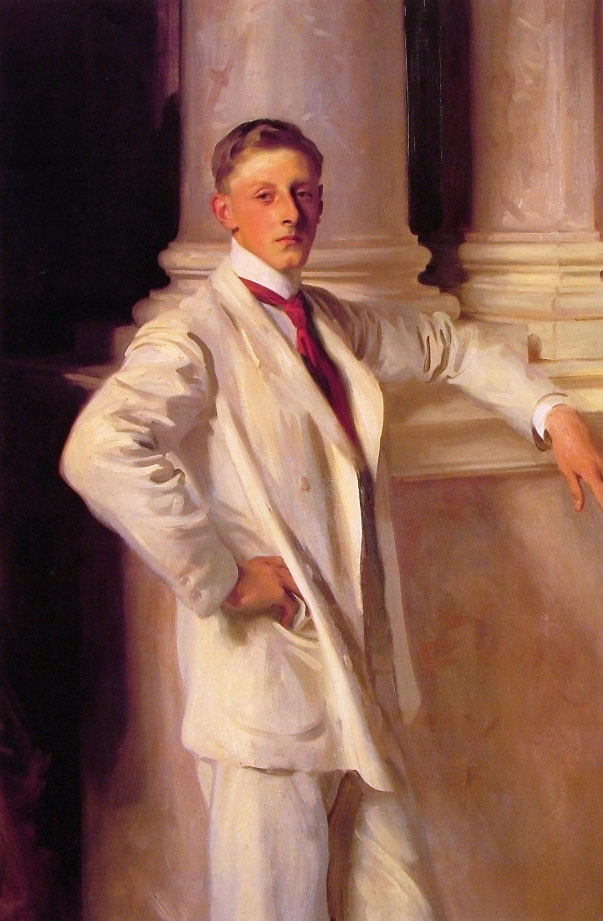
Earl of Dalhousie, John Singer Sargent, 1900

Lord Dalhousie married on 14 July 1903 Lady Mary Heathcote-Drummond (daughter of Gilbert Henry Heathcote-Drummond-Willoughby, 1st Earl of Ancaster). They had four children:

- John Gilbert Ramsay, 15th Earl of Dalhousie (25 July 1904 – 3 May 1950)
- Lady Ida Mary Ramsay (29 January 1906 – 1988) she married Maj.-Gen. Sir George Frederick Johnson on 4 January 1938. They had three children:
  - Sheena Margaret Johnson (28 December 1938)
  - Peter David Johnson (12 June 1940)
  - Robert George Johnson (23 September 1946)
- Lady Jean Maule Ramsay (16 April 1909 – 16 January 1997) she married Lt.-Col. David McNeil Campbell Rose, son of Brig.-Gen. John Latham Rose on 28 April 1945. They have two children:
  - Hugh Ramsay Rose (4 July 1946) he married Flora Campbell Adamson on 5 March 1977.
  - Mary Janet Rose (22 April 1948) she married Major Anthony James Herbert Davies in 1976.
- Simon Ramsay, 16th Earl of Dalhousie (17 October 1914 – 15 July 1999) he married Margaret Stirling on 26 June 1940. They had five children.

== Death ==
Lord Dalhousie died on 23 December 1928 at Brechin Castle.

Peerage of Scotland
Preceded by John William Ramsay	Earl of Dalhousie; 1887–1928	Succeeded by John Gilbert Ramsay
