= Fox Maule-Ramsay, 11th Earl of Dalhousie =

British politician (1801–1874)

The Right Honourable The Earl of Dalhousie KT GCB PC
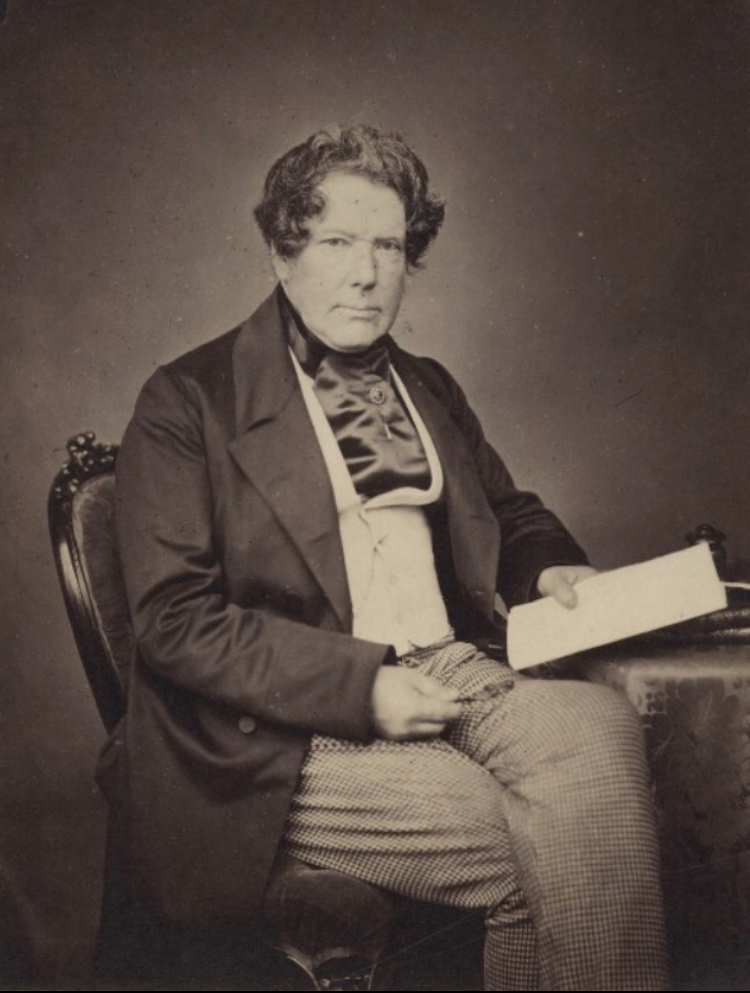
- Daguerreotype of the 11th Earl of Dalhousie, c. 1858

Secretary of State for War
- In office 8 February 1855 – 21 February 1858
- Monarch: Queen Victoria
- Prime Minister: The Viscount Palmerston
- Preceded by: The Duke of Newcastle
- Succeeded by: Jonathan Peel

Personal details
- Born: 22 April 1801
- Died: 6 July 1874 (aged 73)
- Party: Whig; Liberal
- Spouse: Hon. Montague Abercromby (m. 1807; died 1853)
- Parent(s): William Maule, 1st Baron Panmure; Patricia Heron Gordon
- Relatives: George Ramsay, 8th Earl of Dalhousie (grandfather)

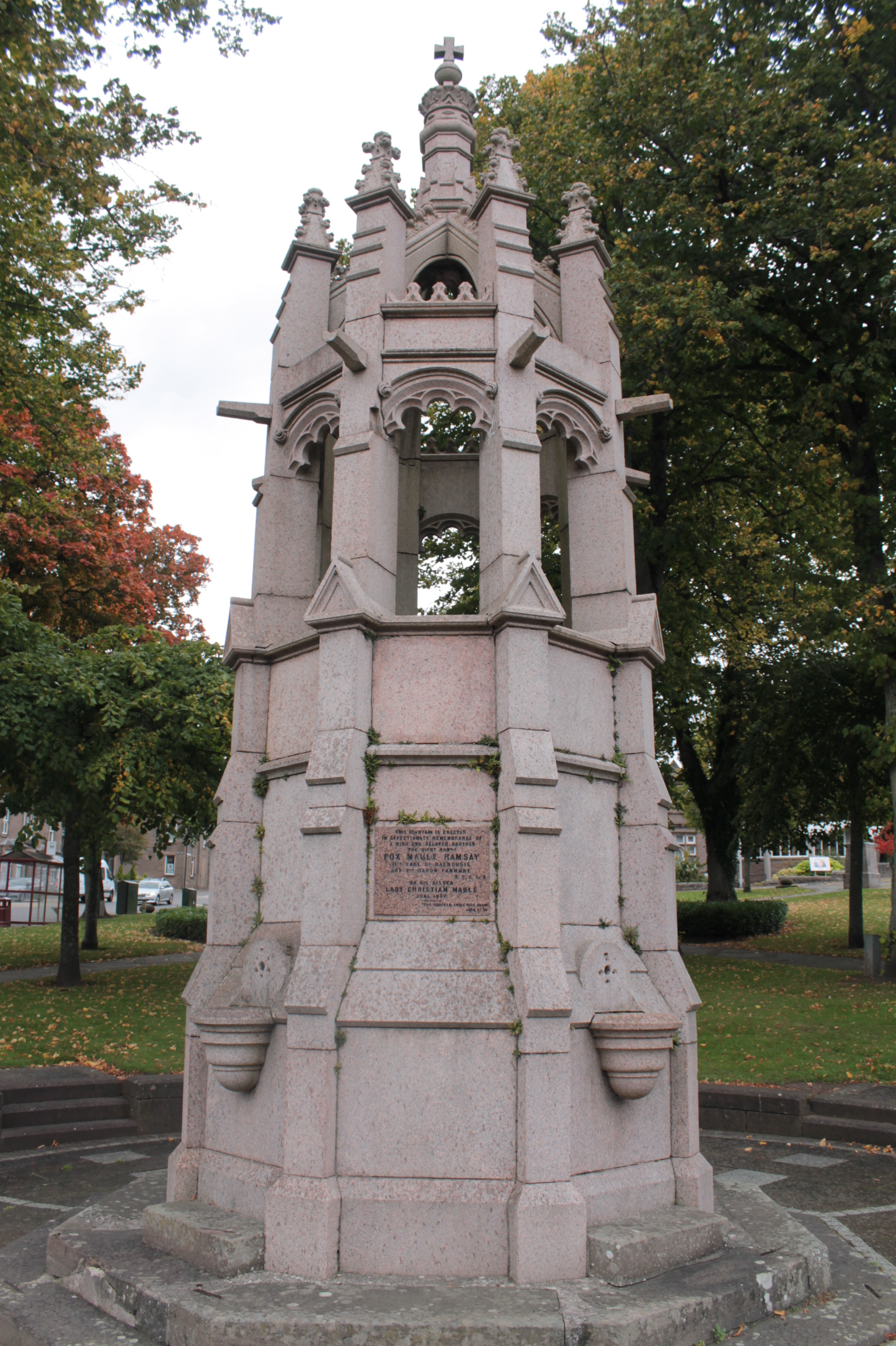
Monument to Fox Maule Ramsay in Brechin

Fox Maule-Ramsay, 11th Earl of Dalhousie, KT, GCB, PC (22 April 1801 – 6 July 1874), known as Fox Maule before 1852 and as The Lord Panmure between 1852 and 1860, was a British politician.

== Ancestry ==
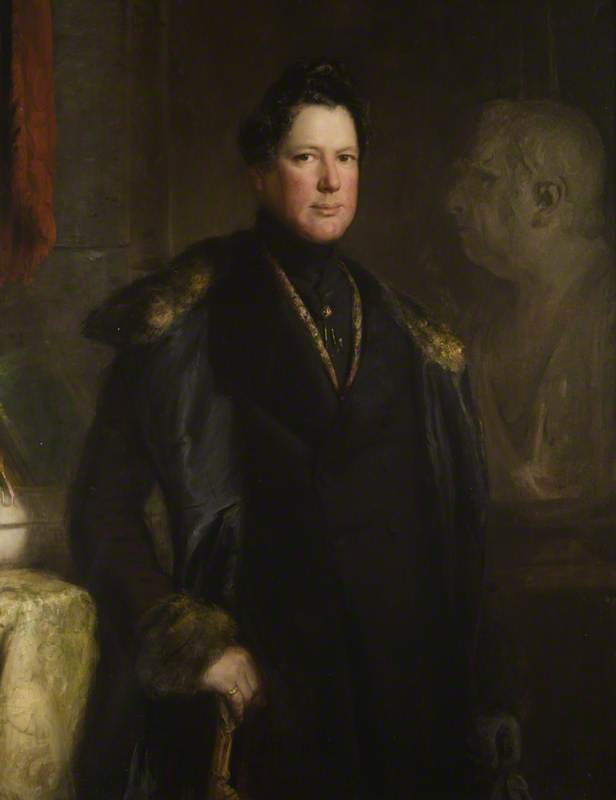
Fox Maule by Thomas Duncan

Dalhousie was the eldest son of William Maule, 1st Baron Panmure, and a grandson of George Ramsay, 8th Earl of Dalhousie. Christened Fox as a compliment to Charles James Fox, the great Whig, he served for a term in the Army.

== Early life and career ==
Fox Maule was born in Brechin Castle, on 22 April 1801. He was educated at the Charter House, London. In 1819 he received his commission as ensign in the 79th Regiment of Cameron Highlanders.

For some years he served in Canada on the staff of his uncle, the Earl of Dalhousie. In 1831, having attained to the rank of captain, he retired from the army, and having married the Hon. Montagu, daughter of the second Lord Abercrombie, he took up his residence at Dalguise House, on the banks of the Tay, near Dunkeld. This was his home for twenty years.

Fox Maule campaigned during the first election for Perthshire, canvassing in favour of his friend, the Marquess of Breadalbane, then Lord Ormelie. As he afterwards said, "I was politically born then." At the next election, in 1834, he was returned as member for Perthshire. Having lost his seat at the next election, he was returned for the Elgin Burghs. Having resigned his seat for the Elgin Burghs, he was elected by the city of Perth, which he continued to represent for ten years, until he was called to the House of Lords after his father's death.

== Political career ==
In 1835 he entered the House of Commons as member for Perthshire. In the ministry of Lord Melbourne (1835–1841), Maule was Under-Secretary of State for the Home Department, and under Lord John Russell, he was Secretary at War from July 1846 to January 1852, when for two or three weeks he was President of the Board of Control.

In April 1852, he succeeded his father as 2nd Baron Panmure. In February 1855, he joined Lord Palmerston's cabinet, filling the new office of Secretary of State for War. Lord Panmure held this office until February 1858. He was at the War Office during the concluding period of the Crimean War, and met a good deal of criticism. He was Keeper of the Privy Seal of Scotland from 1853 until his death.

Always interested in church matters, Dalhousie was a prominent supporter of the Free Church of Scotland after it split from the Church of Scotland in the disruption of 1843. In December 1860, he succeeded his kinsman, the 1st Marquess of Dalhousie, as 11th Earl of Dalhousie. He shortly afterwards changed his surname to "Maule-Ramsay" (his father had changed his surname to "Maule" from the family's patronymic "Ramsay" before being created Baron Panmure).

== Death and legacy ==
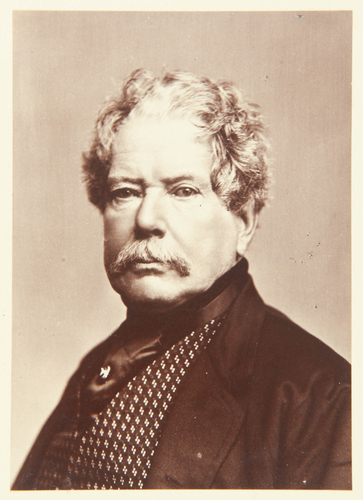
Fox Maule from Royal Collection Trust

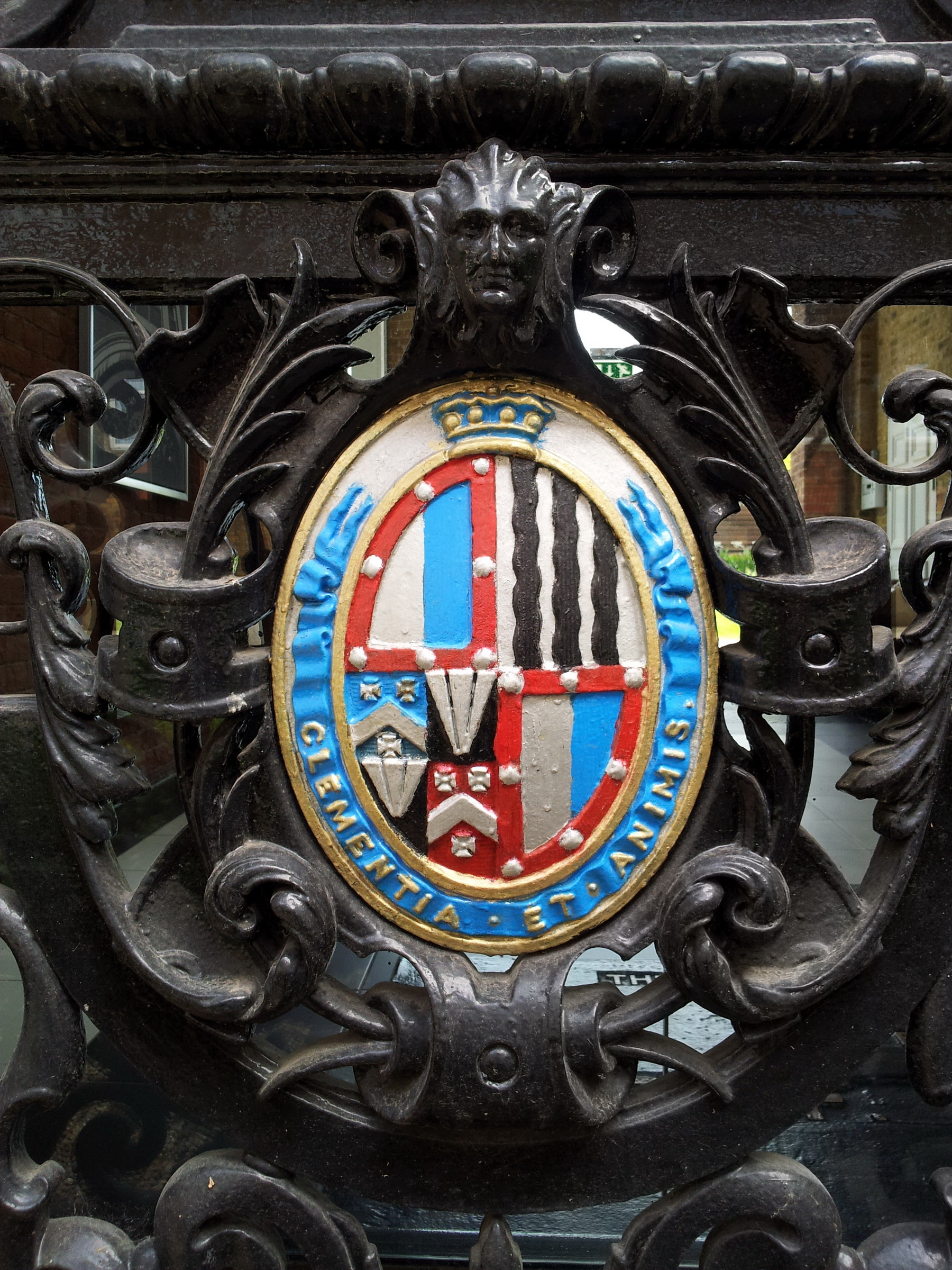
The arms of Lord Panmure (albeit incorrectly tinctured) at Woolwich Arsenal

He died in Brechin Castle on 6 July 1874 in the same room in which he had been born.

== Free Church elder ==
For thirty years he was returned by the Free Presbytery of Dunkeld as their representative elder to the General Assembly, and took an active part in its proceedings. After the Disruption, when so many proprietors refused sites for the building of churches and manses, it was mainly through his speeches in Parliament that the difficulty was surmounted. He laid the foundation stone for the new Free Church at Dunkeld.

== Freemasonry ==
Maule was appointed Senior Grand Warden of the United Grand Lodge of England in 1832, and later (as Lord Panmure) Deputy Grand Master in 1857. He was elected Grand Master of the Grand Lodge of Scotland in 1867. In 1860, Panmure Lodge (now No. 723) was warranted, being named after the then Deputy Grand Master.

== Marriage ==
Lord Dalhousie married the Hon. Montague, daughter of George Abercromby, 2nd Baron Abercromby, in 1831. They had no children. She died in November 1853, aged 46. Lord Dalhousie died July 1874, aged 73. On his death, the barony of Panmure became extinct, but the earldom of Dalhousie (and its subsidiary titles) passed to his cousin, George Ramsay.

Parliament of the United Kingdom
Preceded by Sir George Murray	Member of Parliament for Perthshire; 1835–1837	Succeeded by Viscount Stormont
Preceded by Sir Andrew Leith Hay	Member of Parliament for Elgin Burghs; 1838–1841	Succeeded by Sir Andrew Leith Hay
Preceded by David Greig	Member of Parliament for Perth; 1841–1852	Succeeded by Arthur Kinnaird
Political offices
Preceded by William Gregson	Under-Secretary of State for the Home Department; 1835–1841	Succeeded by Lord Seymour
Preceded by Richard Lalor Sheil	Vice-President of the Board of Trade; 1841	Succeeded by William Ewart Gladstone
Preceded by Sidney Herbert	Secretary at War; 1846–1852	Succeeded by Robert Vernon Smith
Preceded by Sir John Hobhouse, Bt	President of the Board of Control; 1852	Succeeded by John Charles Herries
Preceded by The Duke of Newcastle	Secretary of State for War; 1855–1858	Succeeded by Jonathan Peel
Preceded by The Duke of Newcastle	Secretary at War; 1855–1858	Succeeded by Jonathan Peel
Honorary titles
Preceded by The Earl of Airlie	Lord Lieutenant of Forfarshire; 1849–1874	Succeeded by The Earl of Strathmore and Kinghorne
Preceded by The Viscount Melville	Keeper of the Privy Seal of Scotland; 1853–1874	Succeeded by The Marquess of Lothian
Academic offices
Preceded by The Marquess of Breadalbane	Rector of the University of Glasgow; 1842–1844	Succeeded by Andrew Rutherford
Masonic offices
Preceded by John Whyte-Melville	Grand Master of the Grand Lodge of Scotland; 1867–1870	Succeeded by The Earl of Rosslyn
Peerage of Scotland
Preceded by James Broun-Ramsay	Earl of Dalhousie; 1860–1874	Succeeded by George Ramsay
Peerage of the United Kingdom
Preceded by William Maule	Baron Panmure; 1852–1874	Extinct
