= George Ramsay, 12th Earl of Dalhousie =

Royal Navy Admiral (1806–1880)

Admiral The Right Honourable The Earl of Dalhousie CB
- Born: 26 April 1806
- Died: 20 July 1880 (aged 74)
- Military career
- Allegiance: United Kingdom
- Branch: Royal Navy
- Service years: 1820–1875
- Rank: Admiral
- Commands: South East Coast of America Station
- Awards: Companion of the Order of the Bath

Admiral George Ramsay, 12th Earl of Dalhousie, CB (26 April 1806 – 20 July 1880), known as George Ramsay until 1874, was a British naval officer.

== Career ==
Ramsay was the son of Lieutenant-General the Honourable John Ramsay (1775–1842), fourth son of George Ramsay, 8th Earl of Dalhousie. He served in the Royal Navy from 1820 and was appointed a Companion of the Order of the Bath in 1856. He served as Commander-in-Chief of the South East Coast of America Station from 1866 to 1869 and was promoted to the rank of admiral in 1875. He succeeded his cousin, Fox Maule-Ramsay, 11th Earl of Dalhousie, in the earldom in 1874. In 1875, he was created Baron Ramsay, of Glenmark in the County of Forfar, in the Peerage of the United Kingdom.

Dalhousie's fourth son the Honourable Charles Maule Ramsay was a soldier and politician. Dalhousie died in July 1880, aged 74, and was succeeded by his eldest son, John.

== See also ==
- O'Byrne, William Richard (1849). "Ramsay, George" . A Naval Biographical Dictionary . John Murray – via Wikisource.

Military offices
Preceded by Charles Elliot	Commander-in-Chief, South East Coast of America Station; 1866–1869	Succeeded by None (Downgraded to a Captain's command)
Peerage of Scotland
Preceded by Fox Maule-Ramsay	Earl of Dalhousie; 1874-1880	Succeeded by John William Ramsay
Peerage of the United Kingdom
New creation	Baron Ramsay; 1875–1880	Succeeded by John Ramsay
