= Lauderdale Maule =

Scottish soldier

Lauderdale Maule, DL (27 March 1807 – 1 August 1854) was a Scottish soldier, the second son of the Lord Panmure.

== Life ==
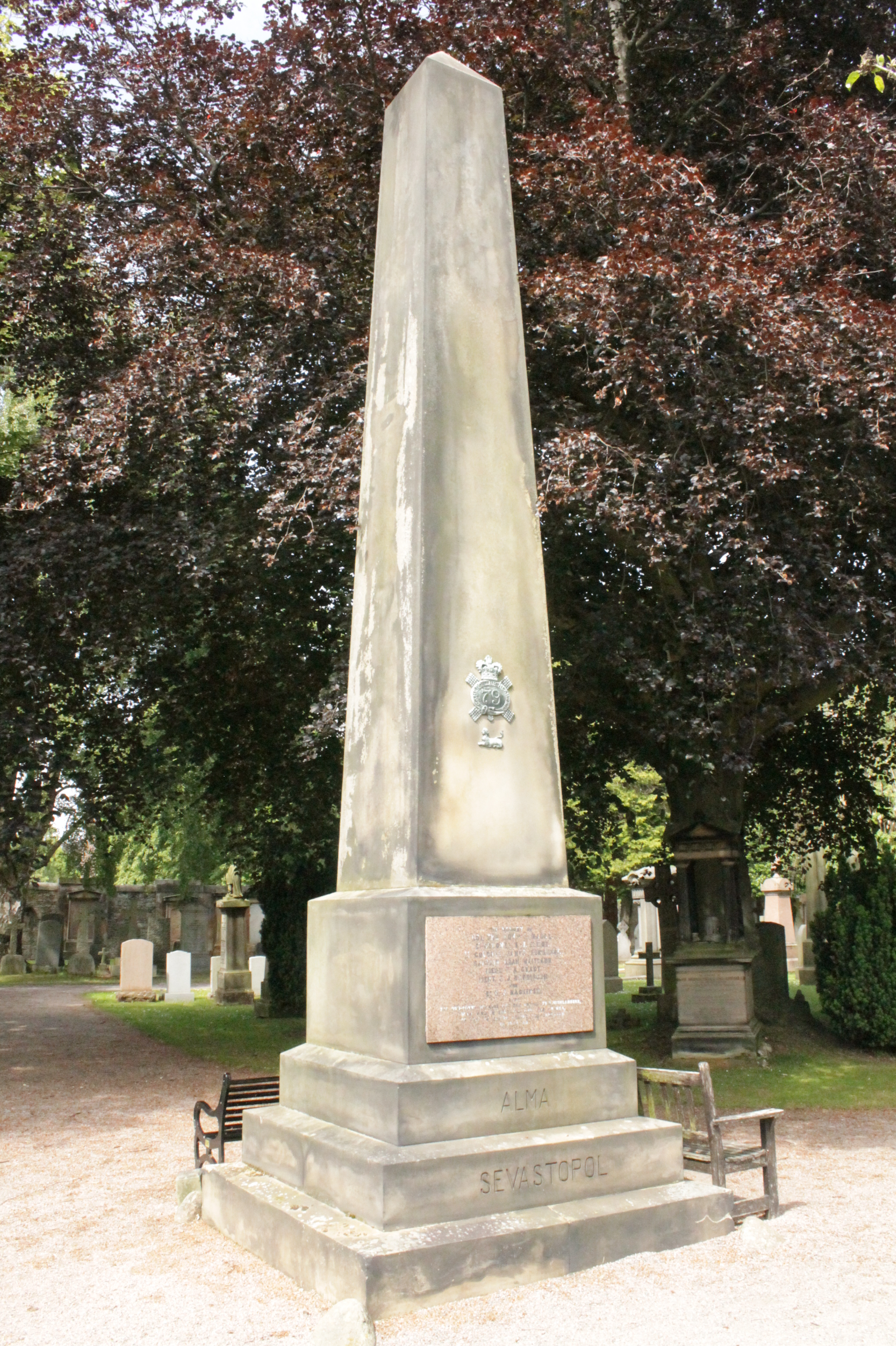
Monument to Lauderdale Maule and the 79th Regiment, Dean Cemetery

Born at Brechin Castle, he entered the 39th Regiment of Foot as an ensign on 24 August 1825. In 1835, he was promoted to captain in the 95th Regiment of Foot, and transferred into the 79th Regiment of Foot on 21 August 1835. He was promoted major in 1840 and lieutenant-colonel on 14 June 1842 after succeeding to command of the 79th.

He was appointed a Deputy Lieutenant of Forfarshire in 1850, and was Member of Parliament for that shire from 1852 until 1854. He retired from the Army in 1852, but was appointed Surveyor-General of the Ordnance on 15 January 1853. During the Crimean War, while carrying out his duties at Varna, he contracted cholera, and died of the disease in a military hospital in Constantinople.

His parents lived at Barton House In Edinburgh and so he would have spent periods of leave there.

He is memorialized in Panbride Church on the east coast of Scotland.

A huge memorial to Maule and the Regiment stands at the centre of Dean Cemetery in Edinburgh.

Parliament of the United Kingdom
Preceded by Lord John Gordon-Hallyburton	Member of Parliament for Forfarshire; 1852–1854	Succeeded by Viscount Duncan
Military offices
Preceded by Sir George Berkeley	Surveyor-General of the Ordnance; 1853–1854	Vacant Title next held by Sir Henry Storks
