= George Ramsay, 8th Earl of Dalhousie =

Scottish peer

George Ramsay, 8th Earl of Dalhousie (1730 – 15 November 1787) was a Scottish peer. He served as a Lord of Police (1775–82) and the Lord High Commissioner to the General Assembly of the Church of Scotland, and was a Scottish representative peer (1774–1787).

Dalhousie was the second surviving son of George, Lord Ramsay (dvp 25 May 1783) and was the grandson of William Ramsay, 6th Earl of Dalhousie (1660 – 1739). His mother, Jean Maule, was the daughter of Hon. Harry Maule of Kellie and thus the niece of the attainted Earl of Panmure.

The attainted Maule estates at Brechin Castle had been bought back by William Maule, 1st Earl Panmure of the second creation, who died childless in 1782. The Maule estates were then divided between Dalhousie and by remainder his second son, William Ramsey.

== Marriage and issue ==
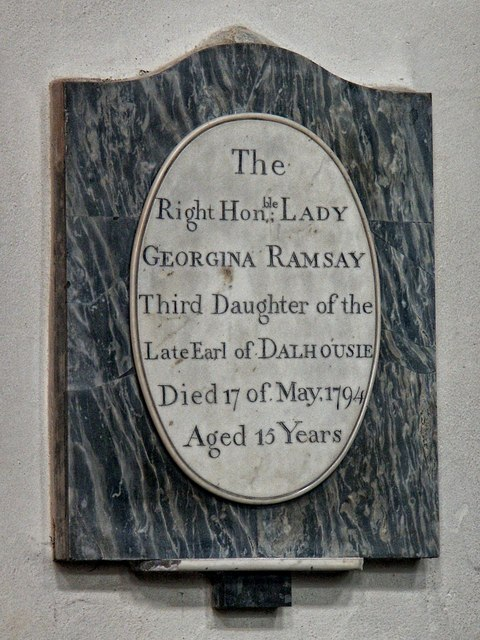
Memorial to Lady Georgiana in St Mary's Church, Stamford

On 30 July 1767, he married Elizabeth Glen and they had 12 children:

- Lady Jane Ramsay (20 May – 11 September 1768)
- Lady Elizabeth Ramsay (6 September 1769 – 17 June 1848), married Sir Thomas Moncreiffe, 5th Baronet
- George, Lord Ramsay (23 October 1770 – 21 March 1838), succeeded as 9th Earl
- Hon. William Ramsay (27 October 1771 – 13 April 1852), later William Maule, created Baron Panmure
- Lieut.-Gen. Hon. James Ramsay (1 October 1772 – 15 November 1837)
- Lady Lucinda Maria (17 November 1773 – 15 June 1812)
- Lieut.-Gen. Hon. John Ramsay (21 April 1775 – 28 June 1842)
- Hon. Andrew Ramsay (6 May 1776 – 2 April 1848)
- Hon. Henry Ramsay (7 September 1777 – 24 July 1808)
- Lady Georgiana (1 February 1779 – 17 May 1794)
- Lady Mary Ramsay (born 21 June 1780), married Capt. James Hay of Drumcar (who died 12 October 1822)
- Hon. Capt. David Cassels Stewart Ramsay (27 December 1782 – 5 September 1801), died in West Indies

Masonic offices
Preceded by James Stewart	Grand Master of the Grand Lodge of Scotland; 1767–1769	Succeeded by James Adolphus Oughton
Political offices
Preceded by The Lord Cathcart	Lord High Commissioner to the General Assembly of the Church of Scotland; 1777–1782	Succeeded by The Earl of Leven
Peerage of the United Kingdom
Preceded by Charles Ramsay	Earl of Dalhousie; 1764–1787	Succeeded by George Ramsay
