= James Ramsay, 17th Earl of Dalhousie =

Scottish noble (born 1948)

The Right Honourable The Earl of Dalhousie GCVO DL
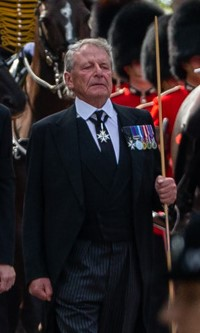
- Dalhousie in Elizabeth II's funeral procession, 2022

Lord Steward of the Household
- In office 22 July 2009 – 22 February 2023
- Monarchs: Elizabeth II; Charles III
- Preceded by: The Duke of Abercorn
- Succeeded by: The Earl of Rosslyn

Member of the House of Lords
- Lord Temporal
- as a hereditary peer 15 July 1999 – 11 November 1999
- Preceded by: The 16th Earl of Dalhousie
- Succeeded by: Seat abolished

Personal details
- Born: James Hubert Ramsay; 17 January 1948 (age 78)
- Party: Conservative
- Spouse: Marilyn Butter (m. 1973)
- Children: 3
- Parent(s): Simon Ramsay, 16th Earl of Dalhousie; Margaret Stirling
- Education: Ampleforth College

James Hubert Ramsay, 17th Earl of Dalhousie, GCVO, DL (born 17 January 1948), styled Lord Ramsay between 1950 and 1999, is a Scottish peer, courtier and landowner. He is chief of Clan Ramsay and Deputy Captain General of the King's Body Guard for Scotland. In that role, he took part in the Royal Procession at the Coronation of Charles III and Camilla.

== Early life and education ==
Dalhousie was born on 17 January 1948, the son of Simon Ramsay (1914–1999), later 16th Earl of Dalhousie, and his wife Margaret Elizabeth Mary Stirling (1914–1997). His mother was a sister of Sir David Stirling, founder of the Special Air Service, and an illegitimate descendant of Charles II. Dalhousie was educated at Ampleforth College.

In 1968, Dalhousie, then styled Lord Ramsay, trained at the Mons Officer Cadet School and was commissioned as a second lieutenant into the Coldstream Guards. In 1971 he transferred from the active list to the Regular Army Reserve of Officers.

== Career ==
Dalhousie had a career in investment banking. On 15 July 1999, his father died and he succeeded to the earldom of Dalhousie as the 17th Earl. He briefly sat in the House of Lords as a Conservative but lost his seat four months later with the passing of the House of Lords Act 1999.

Lord Dalhousie was appointed Lord Steward of Household on 22 July 2009 on the retirement of the 5th Duke of Abercorn. He relinquished his appointment on 22 February 2023 and was succeeded by the 7th Earl of Rosslyn.

He has been Vice Lord-Lieutenant of Angus since 10 December 2002.

== Marriage and issue ==
On 3 October 1973, the then Lord Ramsay married Marilyn Davina Butter (born 22 March 1950), second daughter of Sir David and Lady Butter, at the Guards' Chapel, Wellington Barracks. They have three children:

- Lady Lorna Theresa Ramsay (born 6 February 1975), married Fergus Lefebvre in 2005, has issue
- Lady Alice Magdalene Ramsay (born 10 August 1977), married Michael Dickinson, has issue
- Simon David Ramsay, Lord Ramsay (born 18 April 1981), married Kaitlin Kubinsky in 2016, has issue

In 2019, he listed Brechin Castle, the family seat in Angus, for sale through Savills. Lord and Lady Dalhousie moved to a small house of the estate, which they retained most of. Much of the family's immovable properties have been vested into Dalhousie Estates, a family-run business engaged in farming, property letting and forestry, including shooting, fishing and deer stalking. The business venture provides employment for over 90 people.

Lady Dalhousie is a patroness of the Royal Caledonian Ball.

== Honours ==
- 11 May 2000: Officer (Brother) of the Most Venerable Order of the Hospital of Saint John of Jerusalem (OStJ)
- 17 January 2012: Commander (Brother) of the Most Venerable Order of the Hospital of Saint John of Jerusalem (CStJ)
- 25 March 2023: Knight Grand Cross of the Royal Victorian Order (GCVO)

=== Honorary military appointments ===
- (United Kingdom) 1 June 2008: Honorary Captain, His Majesty's Royal Naval Reserve

== Arms ==
Coat of arms of James Ramsay, 17th Earl of Dalhousie
Coronet A Coronet of an Earl Crest An Unicorn's Head couped at the neck armed maned and tufted Or Escutcheon Argent an Eagle displayed Sable beaked and membered Gules Supporters On the dexter side a Griffin Argent, and on the sinister side a Greyhound Argent gorged with a Collar Gules charged with three Escallops of the first Motto Ora Et Labora (Pray and work!)

Court offices
Preceded by The Duke of Abercorn	Lord Steward of the Household; 2009–2023	Succeeded by The Earl of Rosslyn
Peerage of Scotland
Preceded by Simon Ramsay	Earl of Dalhousie; 1999–present	Incumbent; Heir apparent: Simon Ramsay, Lord Ramsay
Orders of precedence in the United Kingdom
Preceded by The Earl of Wemyss and March	Gentlemen	Succeeded by The Earl of Airlie
