= Patrick Ramsay =

British diplomat

The Honourable Sir Patrick Ramsay KCMG

British Minister to Denmark
- In office 1935–1939
- Preceded by: Hugh Gurney
- Succeeded by: Charles Howard Smith

British Minister to the Kingdom of Hungary
- In office 1933–1935
- Preceded by: Viscount Chilston
- Succeeded by: Owen O'Malley

British Minister to the Hellenic Republic
- In office 1929–1933
- Preceded by: Sir Percy Loraine
- Succeeded by: Sir Sydney Waterlow

Personal details
- Born: Patrick William Maule Ramsay; 20 September 1879
- Died: 19 June 1962 (aged 82) Estoril, Portugal
- Spouse: Dorothy Surtees Tower (m. 1917; died 1957)
- Parent(s): John Ramsay, 13th Earl of Dalhousie; Lady Ida Louisa Bennet
- Relatives: Arthur Ramsay, 14th Earl of Dalhousie (brother); Sir Alexander Ramsay (brother)
- Education: Winchester College
- Alma mater: University College, Oxford

The Hon. Sir Patrick Ramsay KCMG (20 September 1879 – 19 June 1962) was a British diplomat who was minister to Greece, Hungary and Denmark.

== Early life ==
The Honourable Patrick William Maule Ramsay was born on 20 September 1879. He was the second son of John Ramsay, 13th Earl of Dalhousie and the former Lady Ida Louisa Bennet. Among his siblings was older brother Arthur Ramsay, 14th Earl of Dalhousie (who married Lady Mary Heathcote-Drummond, a daughter of the 1st Earl of Ancaster), and younger brothers Sir Alexander Ramsay (who married Princess Patricia of Connaught, a granddaughter of Queen Victoria), Charles Ramsay, and Lt. Ronald Ramsay.

His paternal grandparents were Admiral George Ramsay, 12th Earl of Dalhousie, and the former Sarah Frances Robertson. His maternal grandparents were Charles Bennet, 6th Earl of Tankerville and Olivia Bennet, Countess of Tankerville (eldest daughter of George Montagu, 6th Duke of Manchester).

He was educated at Winchester College and University College, Oxford.

== Career ==
He entered the Diplomatic Service as an attaché in 1904, was promoted to Third Secretary in 1906, Second Secretary in 1911, and First Secretary in 1918. He served in Constantinople, Peking, Paris and St Petersburg before being posted to Stockholm in 1919. While at Stockholm he was promoted to Counsellor of Embassy and acted as chargé d'affaires several times during the absence of the minister, Sir Colville Barclay.

Ramsay was moved to a similar post at Rio de Janeiro in 1925 and to Madrid in 1927. He served as Minister in Athens from 1929 to 1933, Minister and Consul General in Budapest from 1933 to 1935, and Minister in Copenhagen from 1935 to 1939. Upon his retirement in 1939, he was succeeded as Minister in Denmark by Charles Howard Smith, the Assistant Under-Secretary for Foreign Affairs.

== Personal life ==
On 15 October 1917, Ramsay was married to Dorothy Cynthia (née Surtees) Tower (1890–1957). Dorothy, the widow of Christopher Cecil Tower of Weald Hall, was a daughter of Brig. Gen. Sir Herbert Conyers Surtees of Mainsforth Hall. They were the parents of:

- David Patrick Maule Ramsay (1919–1978), who married Hélène Arvanitidi, a daughter of Leonidas Arvanitidi, in 1948.
- James Surtees Maule Ramsay (1923–1944), a Lt. in the Scots Guards who died in the Netherlands at the Western Front during World War II.

Lady Ramsay died on 5 October 1957. Sir Patrick died on 19 June 1962 at Estoril, Portugal.

=== Honours ===
Patrick Ramsay was appointed a Companion of the Order of St Michael and St George (CMG) in the 1929 Birthday Honours and promoted to Knight Commander of the Order (KCMG) in the 1932 Birthday Honours. He retired from the Diplomatic Service in 1939 and lived in Portugal until his death, when he was buried in the British Cemetery, Lisbon. During the Second World War and until a short time before his death he held an honorary post in the British Embassy in Lisbon.

Diplomatic posts
| Preceded by Sir Percy Loraine | Envoy Extraordinary and Minister; Plenipotentiary to the Hellenic Republic; 1929–1933 | Succeeded by Sir Sydney Waterlow |
| Preceded by Viscount Chilston | Envoy Extraordinary and Minister Plenipotentiary at Budapest; 1933–1935 | Succeeded by Owen O'Malley |
| Preceded by Hugh Gurney | Envoy Extraordinary and Minister Plenipotentiary at Copenhagen; 1935–1939 | Succeeded by Charles Howard Smith |
