= Earl of Panmure =

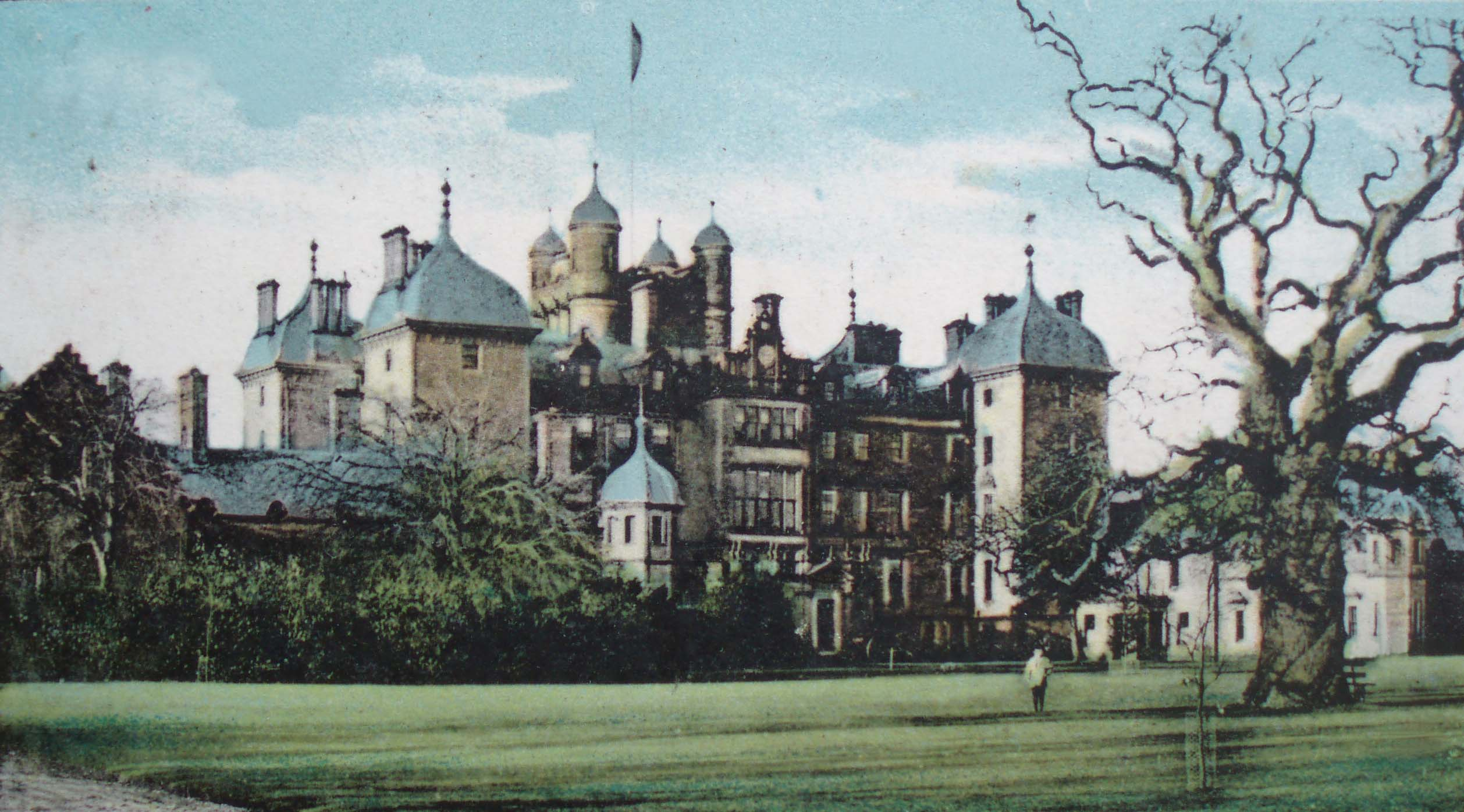
Panmure House, the seat of the Earls of Panmure.

Arms of Maule of Panmure: Per pale, argent and gules, a bordure charged with eight escallops, all countercharged.

Earl of Panmure was a title in the Peerage of Scotland. It was created in 1646 for Sir Patrick Maule, a former Gentleman of the Bedchamber to James VI and loyal follower of Charles I. He was made Lord Brechin and Navar at the same time, also in the Peerage of Scotland. Both titles were forfeit by the attainder of the 4th Earl in 1716 on account of his participation in the Jacobite rising of 1715. The heirs apparent to the Earldom were styled Lord Maule. The seat of the Earldom was Panmure House, built in the 17th century near Monikie, Angus.

The Scottish titles of Earl of Panmure and Baron of Maule remain under attainder. In 1743 the title was created again when William Maule, a grandson of the second Earl and heir and nephew of the attainted fourth Earl, was created Baron Maule, of Whitechurch in the County of Waterford, Viscount Maule, of Whitechurch in the County of Waterford, and Earl Panmure, of Forth in the County of Wexford, in the Peerage of Ireland. William Maule had no heirs and consequently those titles became extinct upon his death in 1782. The 1743 creation differed from the first creation in that it had no territorial particle.

The greater portion of the Panmure estates passed to William another great-nephew of the second Earl and the second son of the Earl of Dalhousie. His surname was changed from Ramsay to Maule in childhood and he became heir to the estates at 16 through his grandmother, Jean, daughter of the Honourable Harry Maule of Kellie. On 10 September 1831 he was created Baron Panmure of Brechin and Navar in the peerage of the United Kingdom. His son, Fox Maule, 2nd Baron Panmure, also inherited the title Earl of Dalhousie (as the eleventh earl).

Panmure House was described as the best house in Scotland after Holyrood Palace. It was demolished in 1955.

== Earls of Panmure (1646) ==
- Patrick Maule, 1st Earl of Panmure (1585–1661)
- George Maule, 2nd Earl of Panmure (1619–1671)
- George Maule, 3rd Earl of Panmure (1650–1686)
- James Maule, 4th Earl of Panmure (1658–1723) (forfeit by attainder in 1716)

== Earls Panmure (1743) ==
- William Maule, 1st Earl Panmure (1700–1782)

== See also ==
- Barons Panmure
