= Braikie Castle =

Coordinates: 56°38′54″N 2°36′27″W

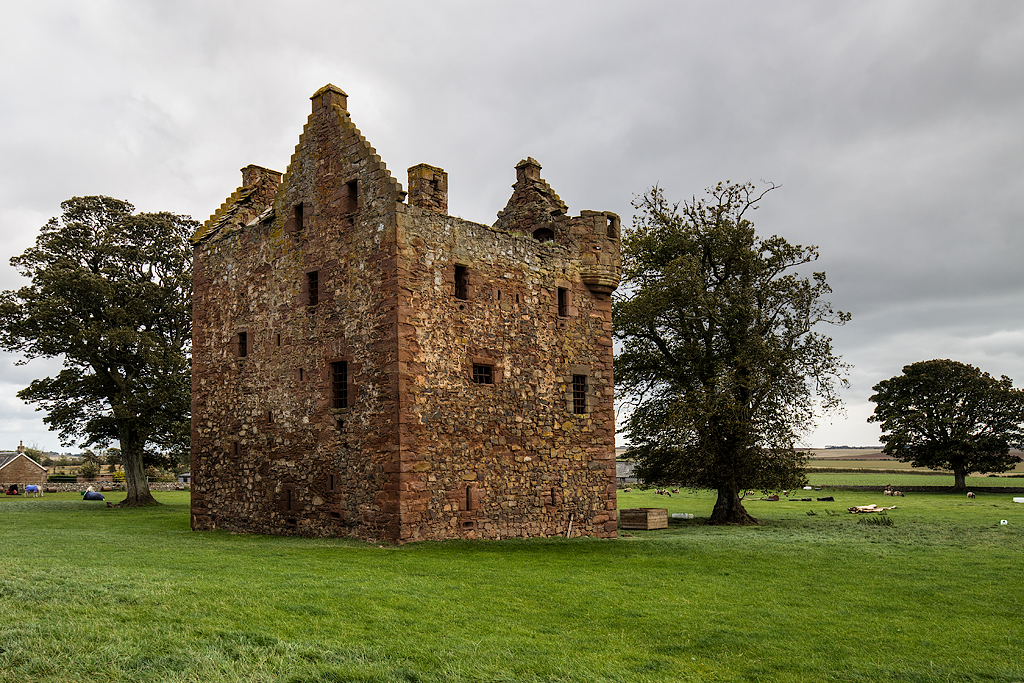
- The castle in 2018
- Interactive map of Braikie Castle

Braikie Castle is a late 16th century Scottish tower house, midway between Arbroath and Brechin, east of the village of Friockheim in the parish of Kinnell. It is sometimes shown as Brackie Castle or Brackoe Castle.

== History ==
A heraldic panel over the door is dated 1581 and the castle dates from at least this date. It was built for Thomas Fraser of Kinnell, the alleged son of the 4th Lord Lovat (as he does not appear in genealogies if true he is an illegitimate son) and is a good example of a fortified laird's house of this period. The date 1581 forms part of a marriage lintel that combines the armorial crests of the Frasers of Lovat with that of the Kinnaird family, also bearing the initials TF and CK. In 1602, Thomas is married to Jane Kinnaird rather than C. Kinnaird.

By the mid-17th century, the castle passed to Patrick Gray and his family. From the Grays it then passed to the Ogilvie family. In 1742, it passed to the William Maule, Earl of Panmure.

The overall form is a four-storey and attic, L-plan house, with the spiral stair in the re-entrant angle. A tall chimney stands adjacent to the stair. It incorporates corbelled bartizans and crow-stepped gables, and is distinctively Scottish in concept. A hidden basement holds the wine cellar.

The castle appears in the magnum opus survey of Scottish castles by MacGibbon & Ross published in 1892, under the name of Brackie.

In around 1960, it lost its roof and remains roofless.

== Gallery ==
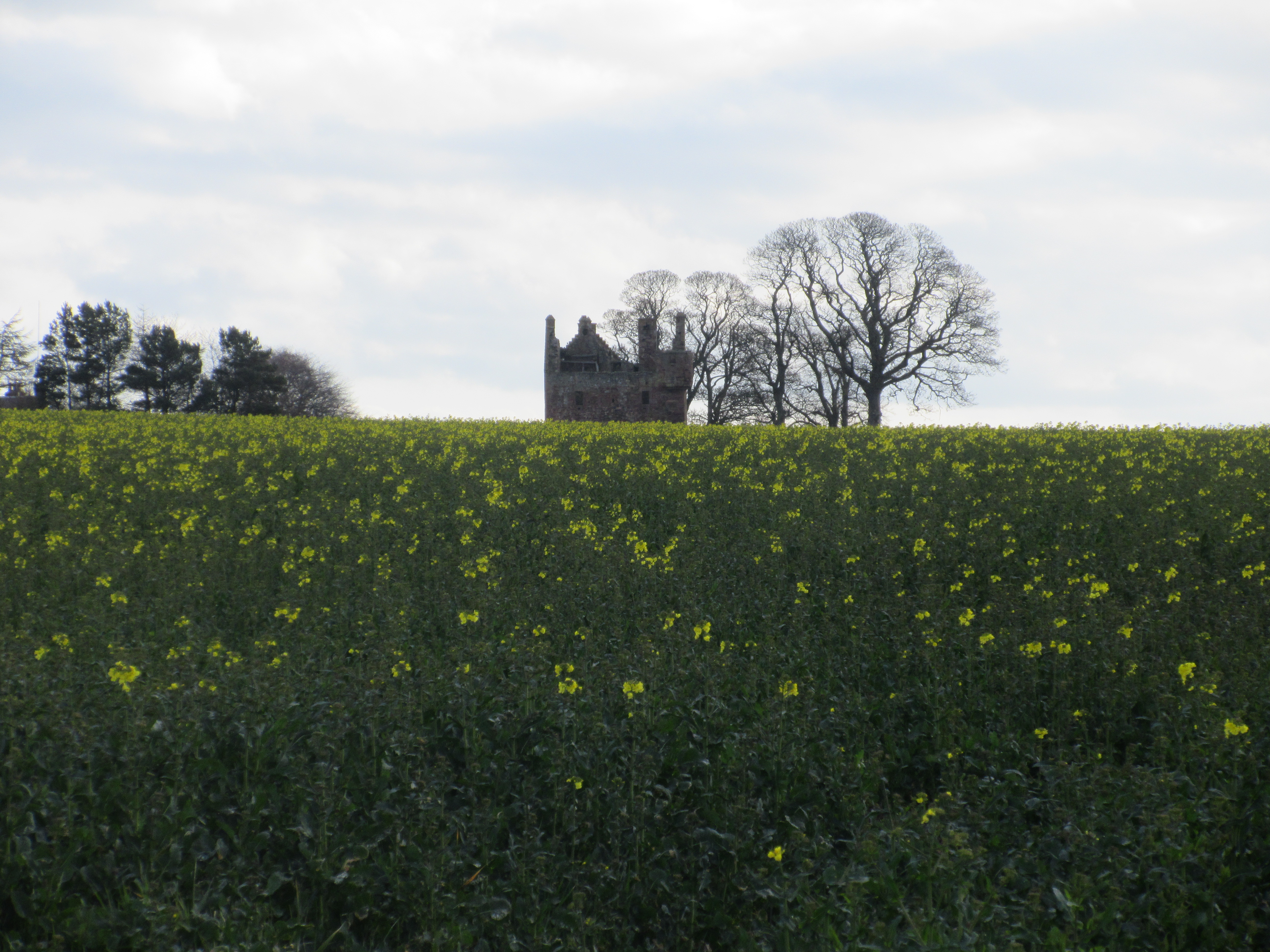
The castle in 2019

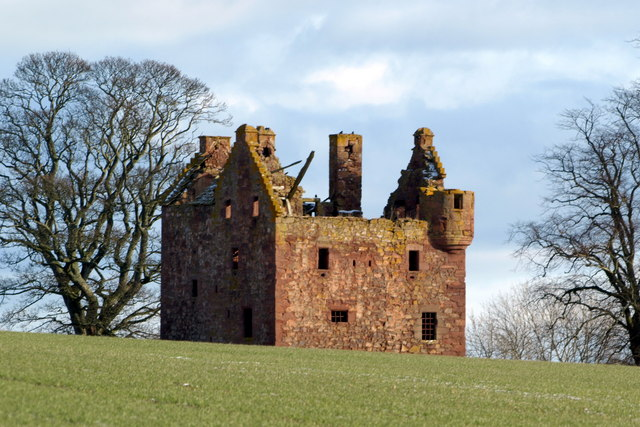
A truncated view of the castle in 2009

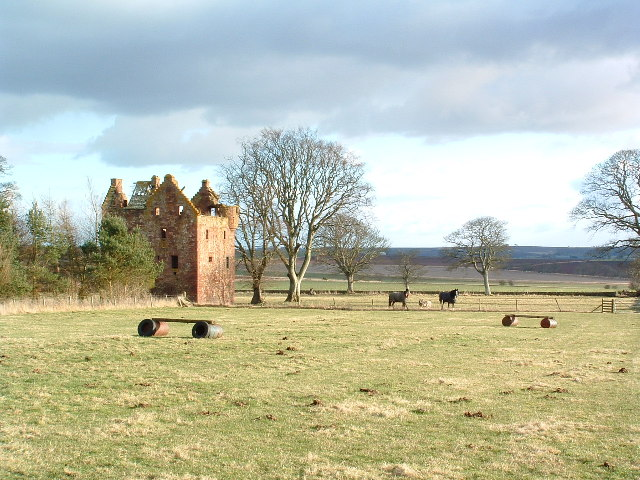
The castle in 2006

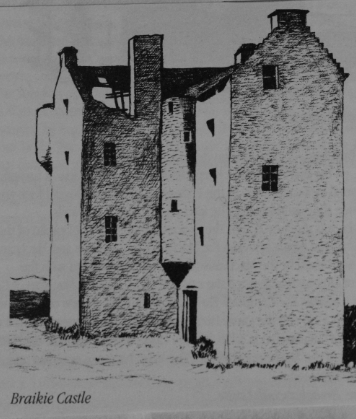
Drawing from 1892
