= William Ramsay, 1st Earl of Dalhousie =

Scottish nobleman (1590–1673)

William Ramsay, 1st Earl of Dalhousie was born 1590 at Dalhousie Castle, Cockpen, Midlothian, Scotland and died 12 February 1673 at Dalhousie Castle, Cockpen, Midlothian, Scotland. He was a Scottish nobleman, army officer and politician.

== Early life ==
He was the eldest son of George Ramsay, 1st Lord Ramsay of Dalhousie, by Margaret, daughter and heiress of George Douglas of Helenhill, brother to William Douglas, 7th Earl of Morton, and Robert, Earl of Buchan. He was chosen to represent the burgh of Montrose in the Scottish parliament in 1617 and 1621. On 21 July 1618 he obtained from the king a charter of the barony of Dalhousie and of the lands of Kerington, Midlothian (Reg. Mag. Sig. Scot. 1609–20, No. 704). He succeeded his father in 1629, and on the occasion of the coronation of Charles I in Scotland was admitted to the dignity of Earl of Dalhousie and Lord Ramsay of Kerington by patent dated 29 June 1633 to him and his heirs male.

== Wars of the Three Kingdoms ==
Dalhousie was among those of the commissioners appointed for the subscription of the king's covenant who were Covenanters; and he subscribed the libel against the bishops presented the same year to the presbytery of Edinburgh. He signed the letter of the covenanting lords of 19 April 1639 to the Earl of Essex, and served as colonel in the covenanting army which took up a position on Dunse Law to bar the progress of Charles I northwards in the First Bishops' War. He also served as colonel in the covenanting army which on 2 August 1640 crossed the River Tweed and invaded England.

At the parliament held at Edinburgh in November 1641 Dalhousie's name was inserted in the new list of privy councillors, to displace others chosen by the king. Dalhousie was engaged in the campaign in England in 1644, in command of a horse regiment, but in the autumn he was called out of England with his regiment to proceed to the north of Scotland to aid Argyll against Montrose. On 2 August 1645 Montrose's second son James, Lord Graham, who had been confined in Edinburgh Castle, was placed with Dalhousie to be educated.

On 24 October 1646 Dalhousie was appointed to the office of high sheriff of the county of Edinburgh. On 4 May 1648 he was nominated colonel of horse for Midlothian, for the engagement in behalf of Charles I; but apparently did not accept the office, remaining a close partisan of Argyll. He was one of the fourteen nobles who attended the parliament of January 1649, when the severe act was passed against those who had taken part in the engagement. In March 1651 he was nominated by Charles II colonel for Midlothian.

== Later life ==
For having sided with Charles II, Dalhousie was fined by Cromwell's Act of Grace of 1654. He died in November 1672.

== Family ==
By his first wife, Lady Margaret Carnegie, eldest daughter of David Carnegie, 1st Earl of Southesk, Dalhousie had four sons and three daughters:

- George, second Earl of Dalhousie (d. 1674);
- John, James, William;
- Marjory, married to James Erskine, 7th Earl of Buchan;
- Anne, married, first, to John Scrymgeour, 1st Earl of Dundee, and, secondly, to Sir Henry Bruce of Clackmannan; and
- Magdalene, who died unmarried.

By his second wife, Jocosa, daughter of Sir Alan Apsley, lieutenant of the Tower of London, widow of Lyster Blunt, son of Sir Richard Blunt of Maple Durham, Oxford, he left no issue.

== Notes ==
Attribution

This article incorporates text from a publication now in the public domain: Lee, Sidney, ed. (1896). "Ramsay, William (d.1674)". Dictionary of National Biography. Vol. 47. London: Smith, Elder & Co.

Peerage of Scotland
New creation	Earl of Dalhousie; 1633–1672	Succeeded by George Ramsay
Preceded by George Ramsay	Lord Ramsay of Dalhousie; 1629–1672	Succeeded by George Ramsay
