= William Maule, 1st Baron Panmure =

Scottish landowner and politician (1771–1852)

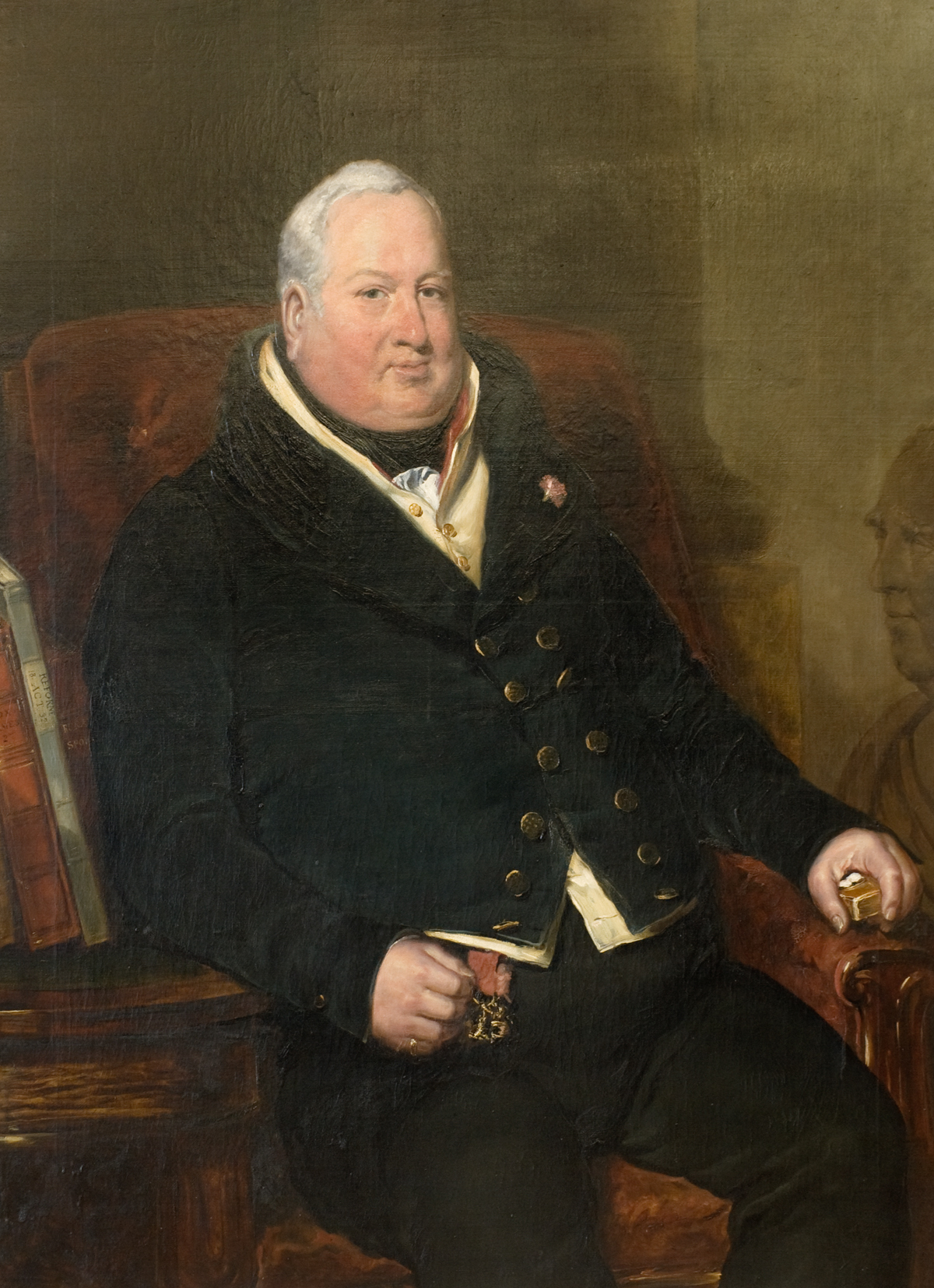
Lord Panmure - patron of (and by) Thomas Musgrave Joy - a painter known principally for his portraits.

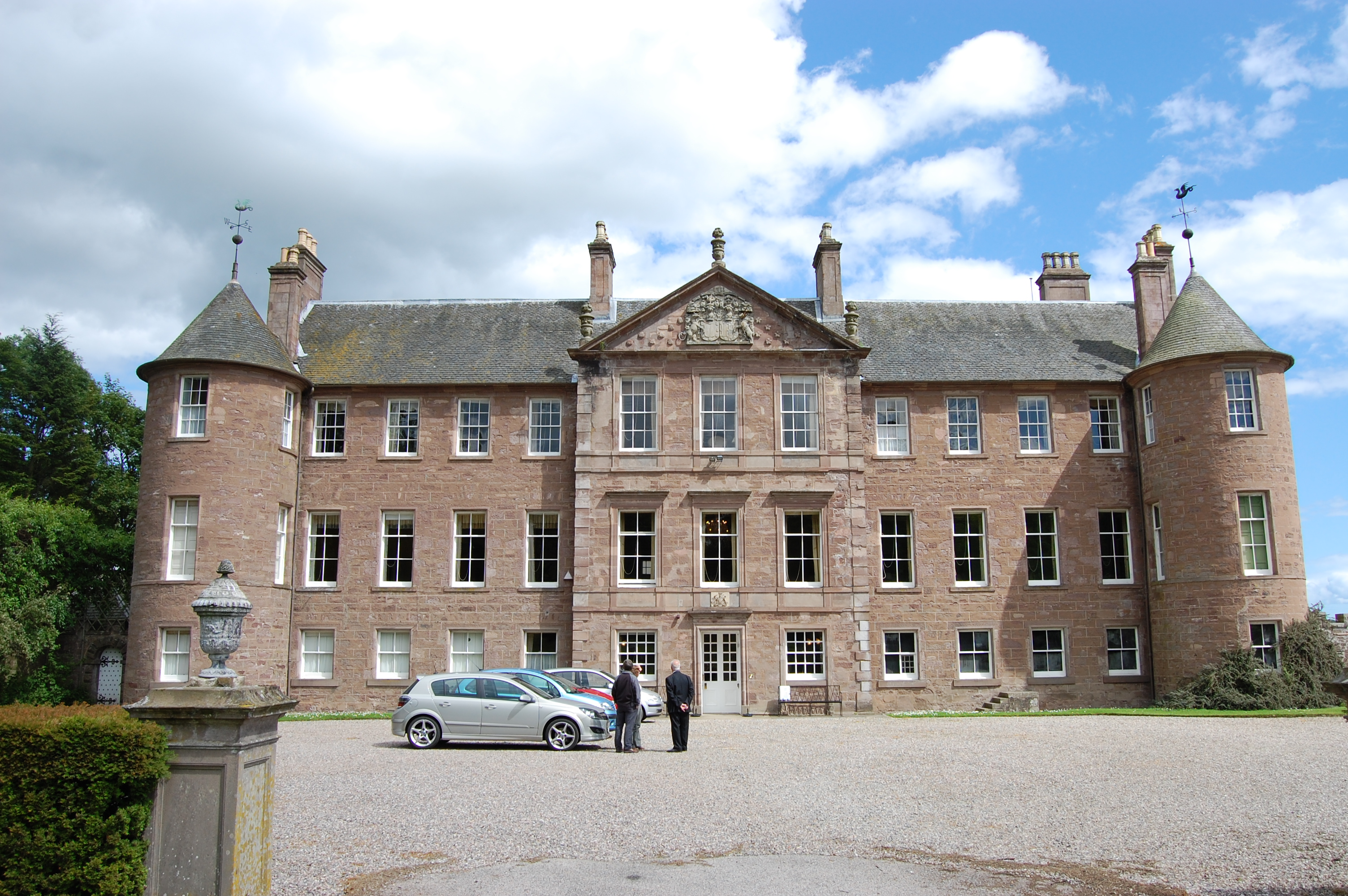
Brechin Castle

William Ramsay Maule, 1st Baron Panmure of Brechin and Navar (27 October 1771 – 13 April 1852) was a Scottish landowner and politician.

== Life ==
He was born William Ramsay, the younger son of George Ramsay, 8th Earl of Dalhousie and his wife Elizabeth Glen. His paternal grandmother was Jean Maule, granddaughter of George Maule, 2nd Earl of Panmure. William attended the High School in Edinburgh from 1780 to 1784 as a contemporary as Walter Scott. On the death of William Maule in 1782, under the terms of Maule's will, he adopted the surname Maule.

In 1782, he succeeded to the Maule estates on the death of his great-uncle William Maule, 1st Earl Panmure, and assumed by Royal licence the same year the additional surname and arms of Maule. He represented Forfarshire in Parliament in 1796 and again between 1805 and 1831, when Maule was raised to the peerage at the coronation of William IV of the United Kingdom, as Baron Panmure, of Brechin and Navar in the County of Forfar, echoing his great-uncle's title.

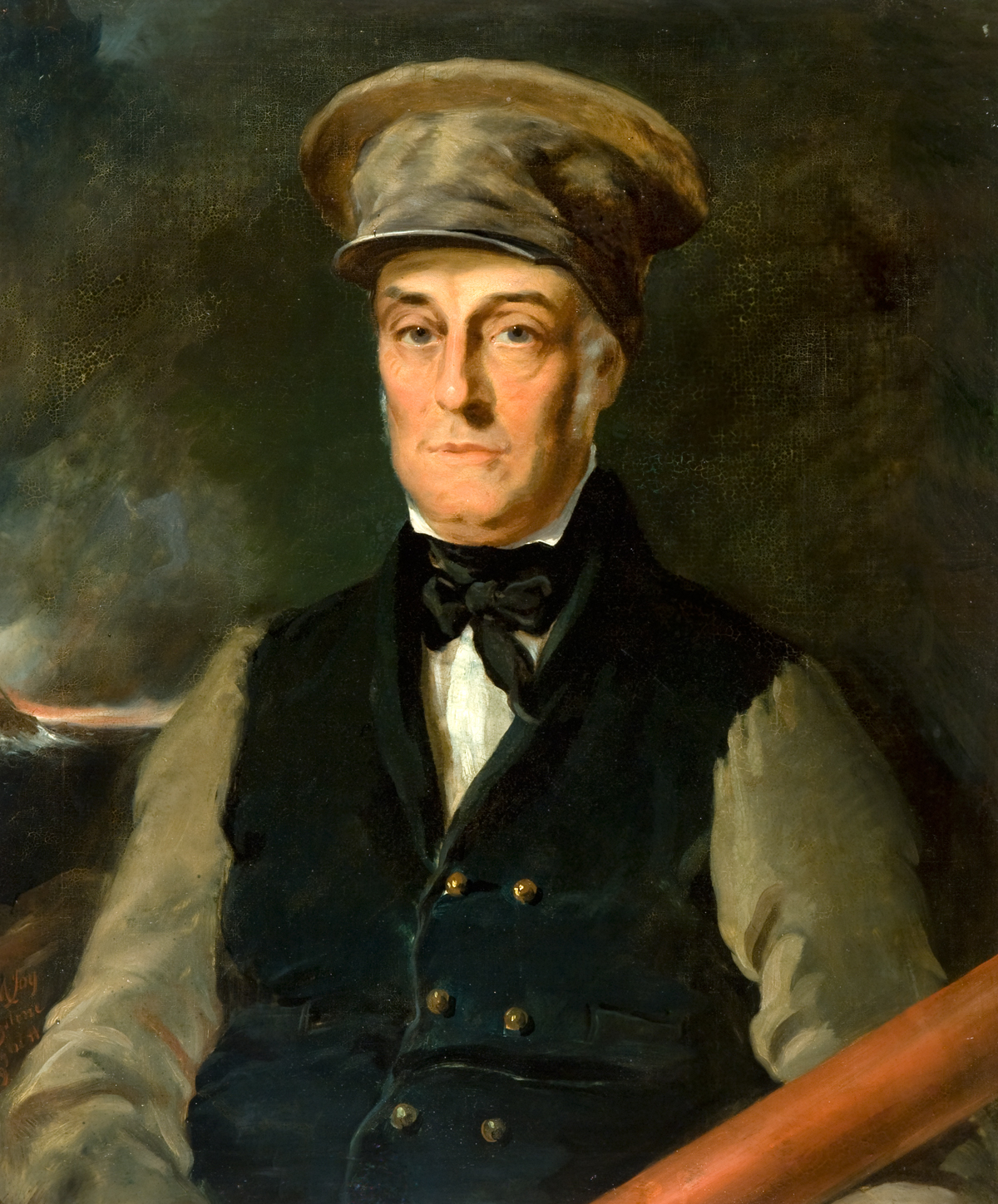
Grace Darling's father William Darling - one of several paintings commissioned by Panmure which are now in the McManus Galleries.

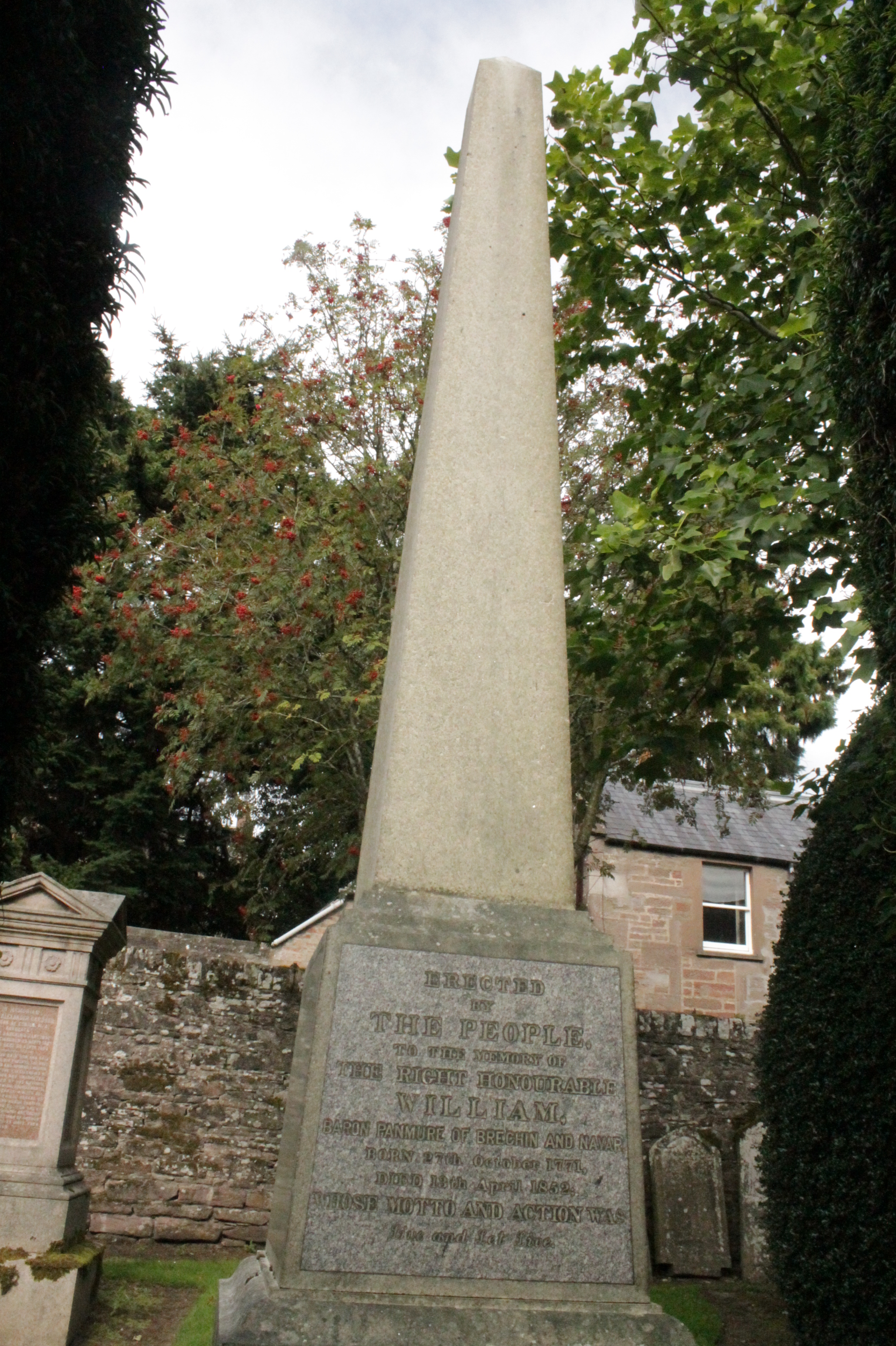
The grave of William Maule, Baron Panmure in the churchyard of Brechin Cathedral

William lived for many years in the family home of Brechin Castle and appears to have remodelled it in the fashionable Georgian style soon after his inheritance.

Panmure was a patron of the artists commissioning several paintings from Thomas Musgrave Joy and paying for him to take on a student.

In 1817, following an unsuccessful attempt to obtain a grant from the Government for Jean Armour, the widow of the poet Robert Burns, Lord Panmure for a number of years settled an annuity of £50 on her.

William was president of the Dundee Royal Infirmary board of directors. Between 1838 and 1852 he donated £2820 to the hospital.

He is buried in the churchyard of Brechin Cathedral. The large obelisk marking his grave lies north west of the church.

== Family ==
Lord Panmure married Patricia Heron Gordon on 1 December 1794. They had nine children, including:

- Fox Maule Ramsay (1801–1874), later 2nd Baron Panmure and 11th Earl of Dalhousie.
- Hon. Lauderdale Maule (1807–1854).

Nevertheless, he was estranged from his wife, and quarrelled with his eldest son for siding with her. Patricia died in 1821, and on 4 June 1822, Maule married Elizabeth Barton. Through this connection he inherited the estates of Barnton, Edinburgh and rebuilt the main house Barton House to a design by David Hamilton.

Masonic offices
| Preceded by The Earl of Moira | Acting Grand Master of the Grand Lodge of Scotland; 1808–1810 | Succeeded by The Earl of Rosslyn |
Parliament of Great Britain
| Preceded by David Scott | Member of Parliament for Forfarshire; April–June 1796 | Succeeded by Sir David Carnegie, Bt |
Parliament of the United Kingdom
| Preceded by Sir David Carnegie, Bt | Member of Parliament for Forfarshire; 1805–1831 | Succeeded by Donald Ogilvy May |
Peerage of the United Kingdom
| New creation | Baron Panmure; 1831–1852 | Succeeded by Fox Maule-Ramsay |
