= James Maule, 4th Earl of Panmure =

Scottish peer

James Maule, 4th Earl of Panmure (c. 1658 – 11 April 1723) was a Scottish peer.

== Biography ==
Born in Monifieth, Scotland, James Maule lived at Ballumbie and became the 4th Earl of Panmure in 1686 on the death of his brother, George Maule, the 3rd Earl.

He married Margaret, the daughter of William Douglas, Duke of Hamilton. He was responsible for commissioning Alexander Edward to reconstruct Brechin Castle between approximately 1696 and 1709, and he also expanded the family seat of Panmure House.

Lord Panmure was a Privy Councillor to King James VII (ruled 1685–1688), and despite being a Protestant, continued to support James after he was exiled by the Revolution of 1688. He was an early supporter of the Jacobite cause, which aimed to restore James and his successors on the thrones of England and Scotland.

On 3rd April 1696, Lord Panmure was elected to the court of directors of the Company of Scotland trading to Africa and the Indies. His involvement in the affairs of the Company was at least partly political. He saw at as a vehicle for mobilising opinion against William III & II and the Court interest.

In 1707, he encouraged rebellion and the return of James by signing a letter suggesting the country would rise to support him. From the Mercat Cross at Brechin in 1715, he proclaimed James Francis Edward Stuart, son of James VII and known as the "Old Pretender", as King James VIII. Panmure went on to fight at the Battle of Sheriffmuir in November of the same year. He was captured but escaped, with his younger brother Henry, via Arbroath to the Continent the following year. This resulted in the forfeiture of the Panmure title and estates. Maule was honoured by the Old Pretender and followed him to Avignon (1716) and then Rome (1717).

He died of pleurisy in Paris, still in exile having twice refused the opportunity of reconciliation with the British government.

He is mentioned in Robert Burns' poem "The Battle of Sherramuir".

Peerage of Scotland
Preceded by George Maule	Earl of Panmure; 1686–1716	Forfeit
