= Brechin Castle =

Castle in Angus, Scotland

Coordinates: 56°43′45″N 2°39′32″W

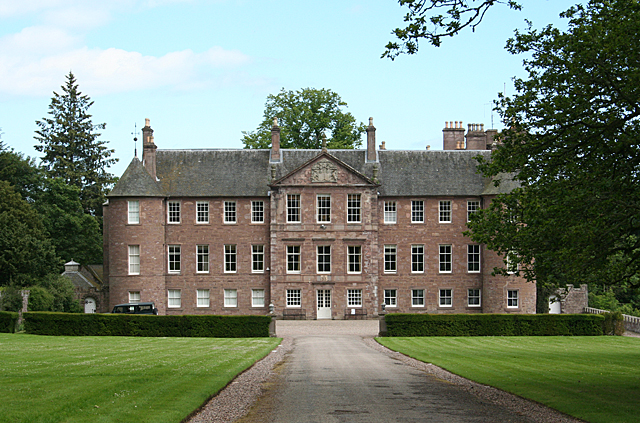
- The castle in 2014
- Interactive map of Brechin Castle

Inventory of Gardens and Designed Landscapes in Scotland
- Official name: Brechin Castle
- Designated: 30 June 1987
- Reference no.: GDL00070

Brechin Castle is a castle in Brechin, Angus, Scotland. The castle was constructed in stone during the 13th century. Most of the current building dates to the early 18th century, when extensive reconstruction was carried out by architect Alexander Edward for James Maule, 4th Earl of Panmure, between approximately 1696 and 1709. The castle is a 37,748 square feet (3,506.9 m^{2}) Category A listed building and the grounds are included in the Inventory of Gardens and Designed Landscapes in Scotland.

== History ==
The grounds have been in the Ramsay family since the 12th century. In 1782, under the terms of a Maule will, William Ramsay adopted the name William Ramsay Maule, thereafter uniting the family names. Ramsay-Maule appears to have remodelled the frontage to a fashionable Georgian style at this time.

The seat of the Ramsay clan was moved from Dalhousie Castle in Midlothian to Brechin Castle in the early 20th century. The castle is the home of the Earl of Dalhousie, the clan chieftain of Clan Maule of Panmure in Angus, and Clan Ramsay of Dalhousie.

Marie Stewart, Countess of Mar entertained her brother-in-law, the Earl of Huntly at Brechin in September 1593. She hosted John Taylor the Water Poet, and King James on his return to Scotland in 1617. She had inventories made of the contents and furnishings of Brechin Castle in 1611 and 1622. Brechin Castle has been a stronghold of the Ramsay family since around 1645.

The estate consisted of approximately 150,000 acres (61,000 ha) at its height and is now 55,000 acres (22,000 ha). The formal gardens date to the early 18th century. Agriculture and forestry largely dominate the estate grounds, but tourists can stay at several guest lodges on the property.

The castle has been Category A Listed since 1971. The summary states that the battlemented flank walls were added in the mid-1800s, the building was remodelled 1854 and that a tower was added in 1863. Other modifications were also made in that era.

A 1990s addition to the grounds is Brechin Castle Centre, described as a "Country Park with Cafe and Garden Centre, plus loads of kids activities in the Park and in a Yard Play Area." As of 2018 the castle and gardens were open to the public in June/July.

On September 11, 2022, the royal cortège carrying the body of Queen Elizabeth II from Balmoral Castle to the Palace of Holyroodhouse in Edinburgh made a private, 45 minute stop at Brechin Castle to allow the drivers and participants to rest.

== Sale of the castle ==
In 2019, the building and the 70-acre grounds of Brechin Castle were put up for sale by the 17th Earl of Dalhousie, the chief of Clan Ramsay, who cited prohibitive upkeep costs as the motivating factor for the sale. A news report stated that the castle has eight reception rooms, 16 bedrooms and 10 bathrooms.

Another news report made this statement: "Of the early medieval building little evidence remains. The oldest part of the current castle is the kitchen block, where can be seen a stone bearing the date 1703, but in 1711 major renovations were made which gave the building its current form". Edzell and Invermark and the family businesses – including Brechin Castle Garden Centre and Peggy Scott’s – were not being sold.

== Gallery ==
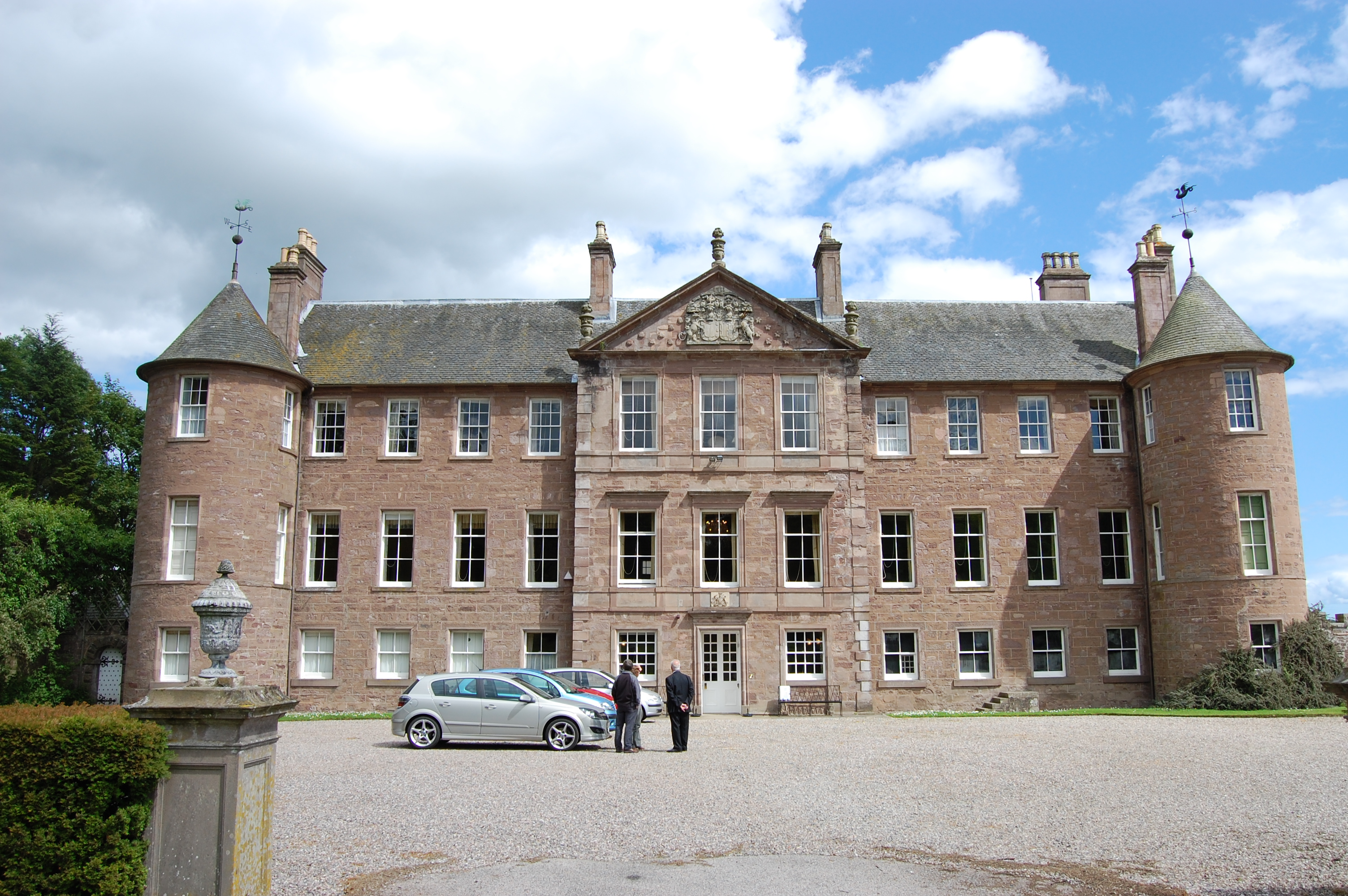
The castle in 2009

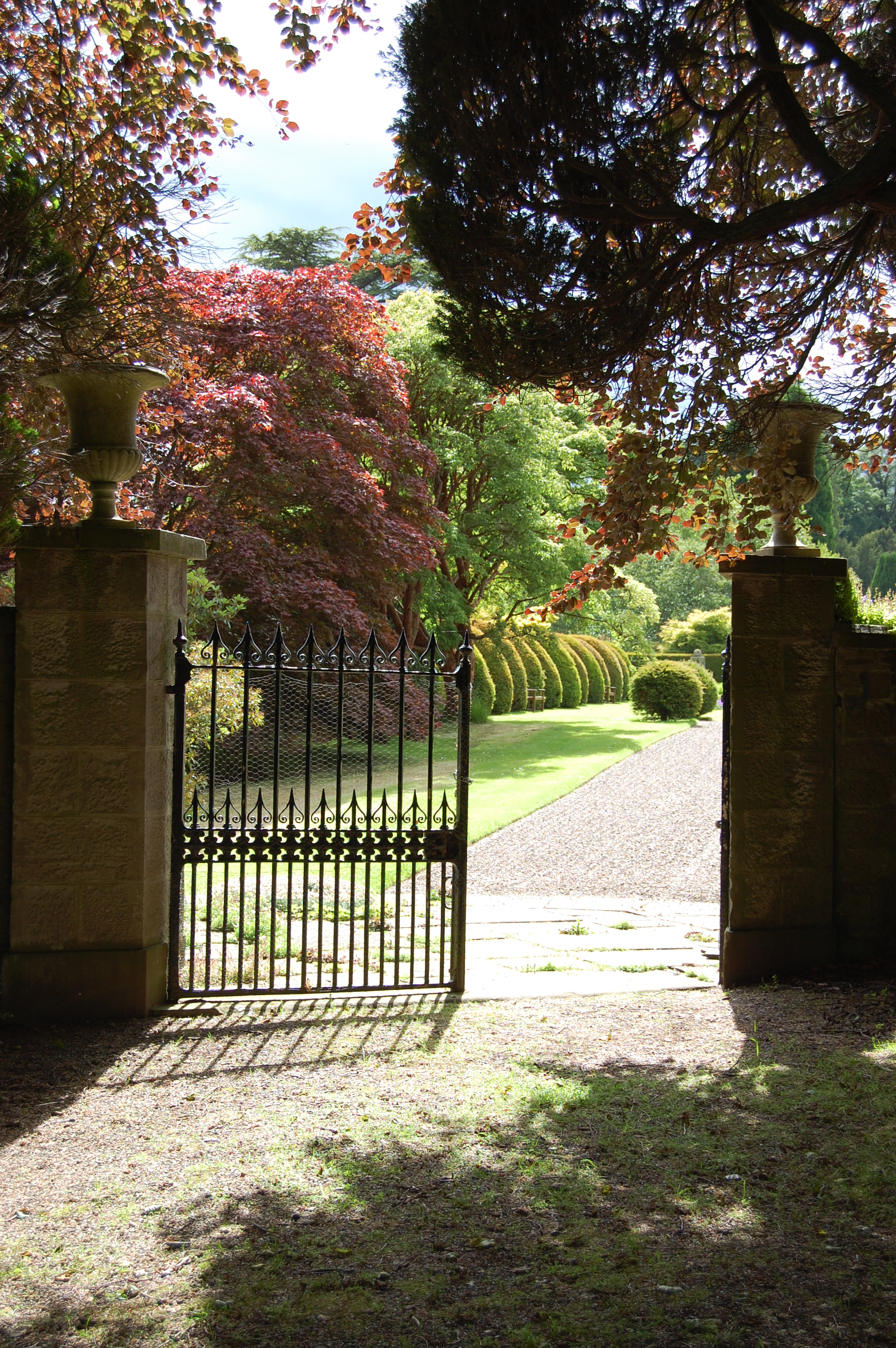
A garden gate in 2009

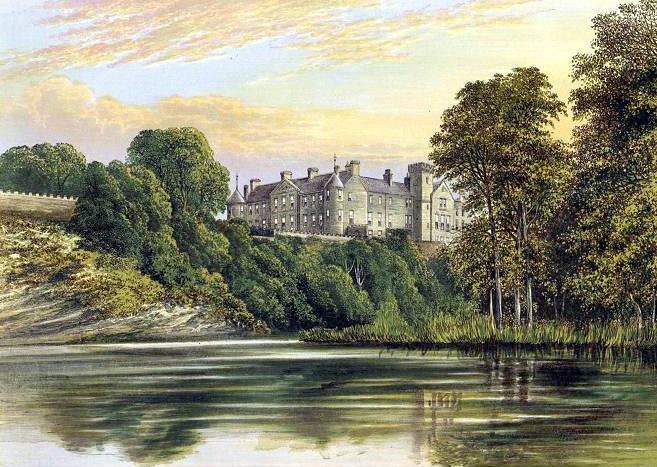
Painting, c. 1880

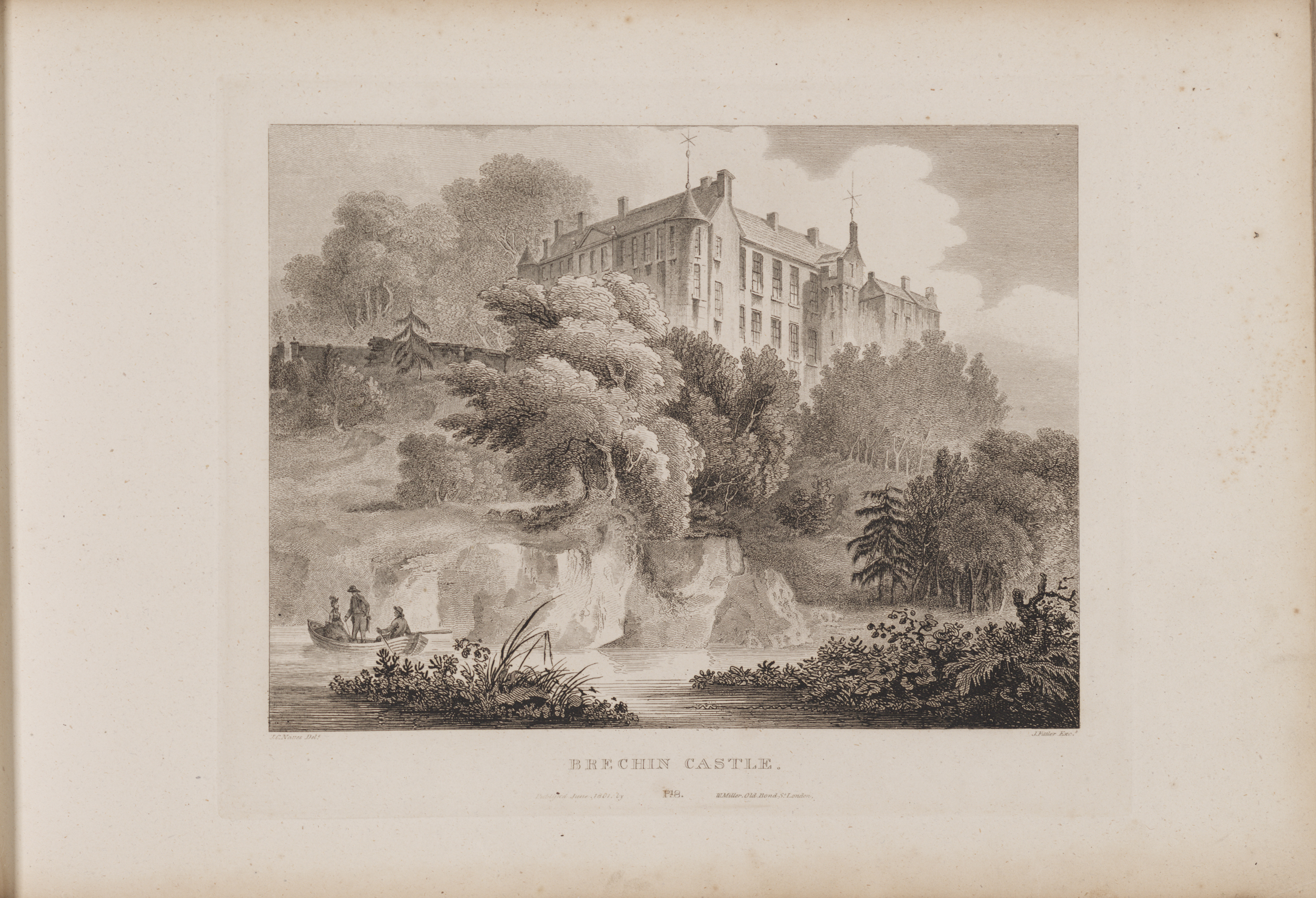
Engraving of the castle from Scotia Depicta by James Fittler, 1804

== See also ==
- Montrose Basin
