= 1830 Liverpool by-election =

British election

30 November 1830
Candidate	William Ewart	Evelyn Denison
Party	Radical	Whig
Popular vote	2,215	2,186
Percentage	50.3%	49.7%
Member of Parliament (MP) before election
William Huskisson
Tory
Elected Member of Parliament (MP)
William Ewart
Radical

The 1830 Liverpool by-election took place on 30 November to elect one of Liverpool's two Members of Parliament (MPs) after the death of incumbent William Huskisson. Huskisson, who had died in a railway accident in September, was a Tory, as was fellow MP Isaac Gascoyne. Radical William Ewart defeated Whig Evelyn Denison. Both men's views were regarded as similar, but Denison was considered more elitist and anti-reform.

After allegations of bribery, the election was nullified in March. Both Ewart and Denison defeated Gascoyne heavily in the following year's general election.

== Background ==
The constituency of Liverpool was entitled to two Members of Parliament (MPs). Since 1729, franchise in the constituency had been restricted to the Mayor, bailiffs, and freemen who were not receiving alms. This gave an electorate size contemporaneously estimated to be around 3,000, although modern sources give more than 5,000 eligible voters in the early 1830s.

Isaac Gascoyne and George Canning heavily defeated two other candidates to receive the seats in 1820. Canning became prime minister in 1823, whereupon his protege, William Huskisson, succeeded him in the constituency. Gascoyne and Huskisson would continue as MPs until Huskisson died in an accident while attending the opening of the Liverpool and Manchester Railway on 15 September, necessitating a by-election to determine his successor.

== Campaign ==
Campaigning for the election began before Huskisson was buried, on 24 September.

William Ewart, a member of multiple commercial and politically-linked families, announced his candidacy on 1 October.

A Mr. Gladstone was speculated as a possible third candidate on 22 October, but had not formally entered the race as of the following day. At the same time, the opinions of Denison and Ewart were considered so identical that in the absence of a third candidate the race was considered "in great measure a personal one". Nevertheless, Denison was criticised for failing to disclose his opinions on various issues to the electorate at that time.

During the campaign, Denison was criticised for espousing aristocratic and anti-franchise expansion views, which were considered especially hypocritical given that he had visited America.

== Results ==
This election was conducted over the course of 7 days.

By-election, 30 November 1830: Liverpool
Party	Candidate	Votes	%	±%
Radical	William Ewart	2,215	50.3	+30.6
Whig	Evelyn Denison	2,186	49.7	N/A
Majority		29	0.6	N/A
Turnout		4,401	c. 82.3	c. +77.0
Registered electors		c. 5,350		
Radical gain from Tory		Swing	N/A	

== Aftermath ==
Both sides accused each other of bribery, and the election was declared null and void in March.

In the 1831 election, both Denison and Ewart defeated Gascoyne by a respective 1,886 and 1,910 to Gascoyne's 610. Gascoyne, mockingly described as "Gallant" by the Morning Chronicle, was also deemed to have "the ambition to obtain a bad pre-eminence".
