= Howard Douglas =

British Army general (1776–1861)

General Sir Howard Douglas GCB Bt GCMG FRS
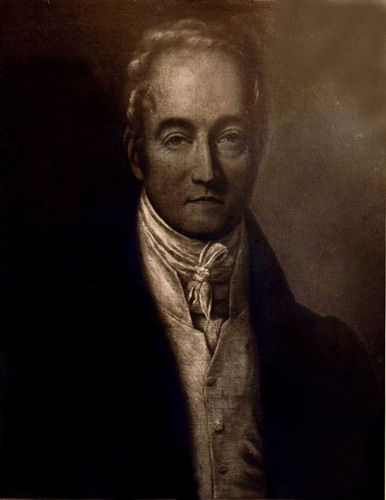

3rd Lieutenant-Governor of New Brunswick
- In office 1824–1831
- Monarchs: George IV; William IV
- Preceded by: George Stracey Smyth
- Succeeded by: Sir Archibald Campbell, 1st Baronet

Member of Parliament for Liverpool
- In office 1842–1847
- Preceded by: Cresswell Cresswell and Dudley Ryder
- Succeeded by: Thomas Bernard Birch and Dudley Ryder

Personal details
- Born: 23 January 1776 Gosport, England
- Died: 9 November 1861 (aged 85) Tunbridge Wells, England
- Party: Conservative
- Spouse: Anne Dundas (m. 1799)
- Relations: Rear-Admiral Sir Charles Douglas (father), Vice-Admiral Sir William Henry Douglas (brother)
- Awards: Knight Grand Cross of the Order of the Bath; Knight Grand Cross of the Order of St Michael and St George; Fellow of the Royal Society

Military service
- Allegiance: Great Britain
- Branch/service: Army
- Years of service: 1794–1861
- Rank: General
- Battles/wars: Napoleonic Wars

General Sir Howard Douglas, 3rd Baronet, GCB, GCMG, FRS (23 January 1776 – 9 November 1861) was a British Army officer born in Gosport, England, the younger son of Admiral Sir Charles Douglas, and a descendant of the Earls of Morton. He was an English army general, author, colonial administrator and Member of Parliament for Liverpool.

== Early life ==
Following the death of his mother, Sarah Wood Douglas, in 1779, Howard was raised by his aunt, Helena Baillie, near Edinburgh. As a boy, he wanted to join the Royal Navy and follow in the footsteps of his father and older brother. His father agreed to take him to sea when he was 13, but Sir Charles died of apoplexy while in Edinburgh just after he arrived to collect Howard in 1789. Howard's guardians thought it better that he serve in the Army instead, and he entered the Royal Military Academy, Woolwich, in 1790. He was commissioned Second Lieutenant in the Royal Artillery in 1794, becoming Lieutenant a few months later.

== Early career ==
In 1795, he was shipwrecked while in charge of a draft for Canada, and lived with his men for a whole winter on the Labrador coast. Soon after his return to England in 1799, he was made a Captain-Lieutenant. In his regimental service during the next few years, he was attached to all branches of the artillery in succession, becoming Captain in 1804, after which he was placed on half-pay to serve at the Royal Military College (RMC), then located at High Wycombe. He taught military strategy and was an authority on military and naval engineering. He served intermittently as commandant of the senior department and as inspector general of instructions at the RMC. In 1804, Douglas was appointed to a majority in the York Rangers, a corps immediately afterwards reduced. He remained on the roll of its officers until promoted Major-General. The senior department of the RMC at High Wycombe, of which he was in charge, was the forerunner of the Staff College. Douglas was promoted brevet Lieutenant-Colonel in 1806. He served from 1808–09 in the Peninsular War and was present at the Battle of Corunna, after which he took part in the Walcheren Campaign.

On the death of his half-brother, Vice-Admiral Sir William Douglas in 1809, he succeeded to the baronetcy. In 1812, he was employed in special missions in the north of Spain, and took part in numerous minor operations in that region, but he was soon recalled, the Home Government deeming his services indispensable to the Royal Military College. He became brevet Colonel in 1814 and CB in 1815. He became a fellow of the Royal Society on 25 January 1816.

== Early writings and promotion to Major-General ==
In 1816 appeared his Essay on the Principles and Construction of Military Bridges, in 1819, Observations on the Motives, Errors and Tendency of M. Carnots System of Defence, and in the following year his A Treatise on Naval Gunnery (of which numerous editions and translations appeared up to the general introduction of rifled ordnance). In 1821, he was promoted to Major-General. Douglas's criticisms of Carnot led to an important experiment being carried out at Woolwich in 1822, and his Naval Gunnery became a standard text-book, and indeed first drew attention to the subject of which it treated.

== Lieutenant-Governor of New Brunswick ==
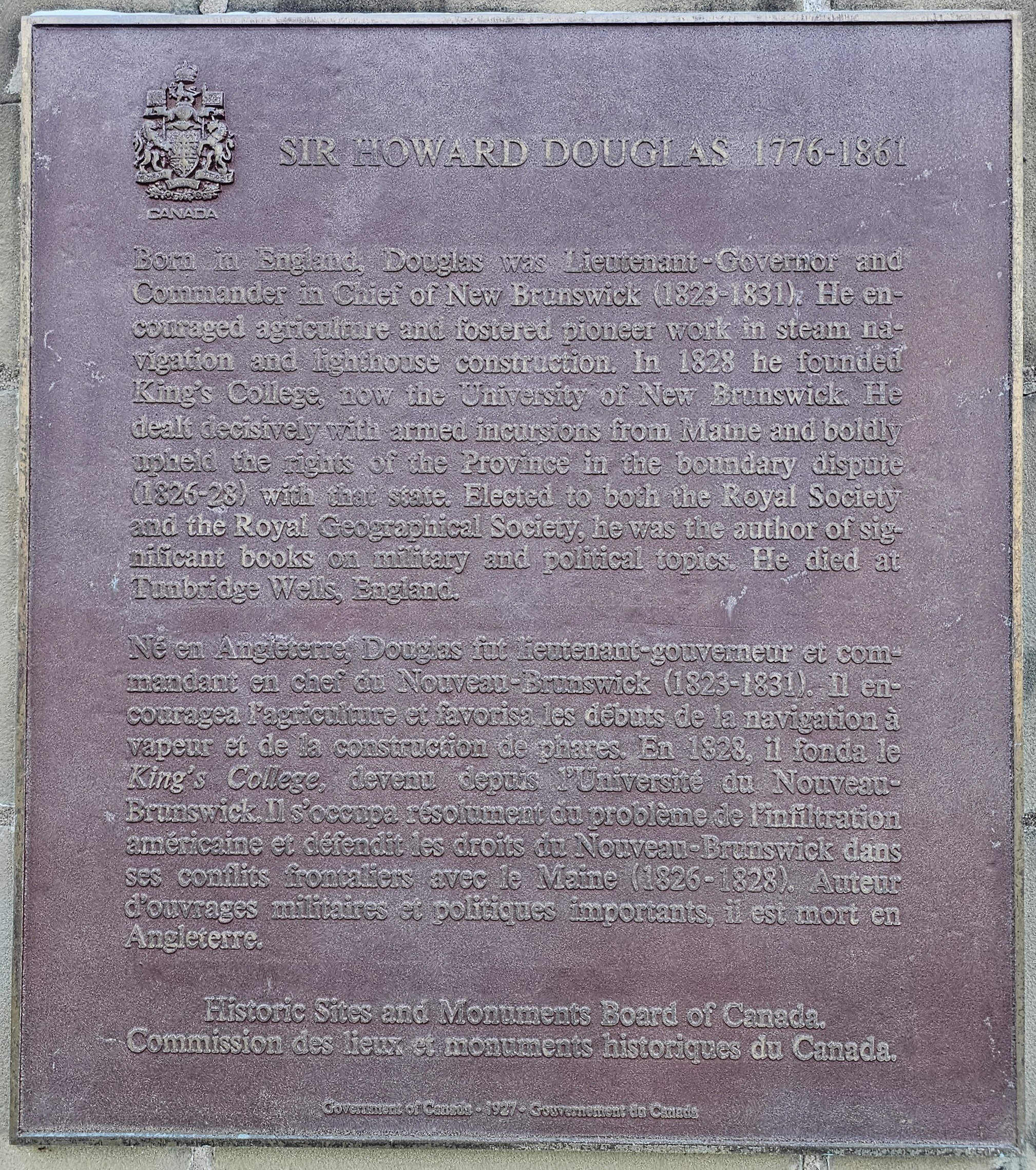
A plaque honoring Douglas on the grounds of the New Brunswick Legislative Building in Fredericton

Sir Howard Douglas became Governor of New Brunswick (1823–31). He had to deal with the Maine boundary dispute with the United States of 1828. He also founded Fredericton College (King's College), now known as the University of New Brunswick, of which he was the first Chancellor. He was governor during the Miramichi fire of 1825, and his actions during that crisis increased his popularity with the people of the province. He secured a charter for King's College at Fredericton (later the University of New Brunswick). Some subsequent light is shed on local society in his period of office in the novel Lady Rosamond's Secret. A Romance of Fredericton (1878) by the Rebecca Agatha Armour.

== Later career in Europe ==
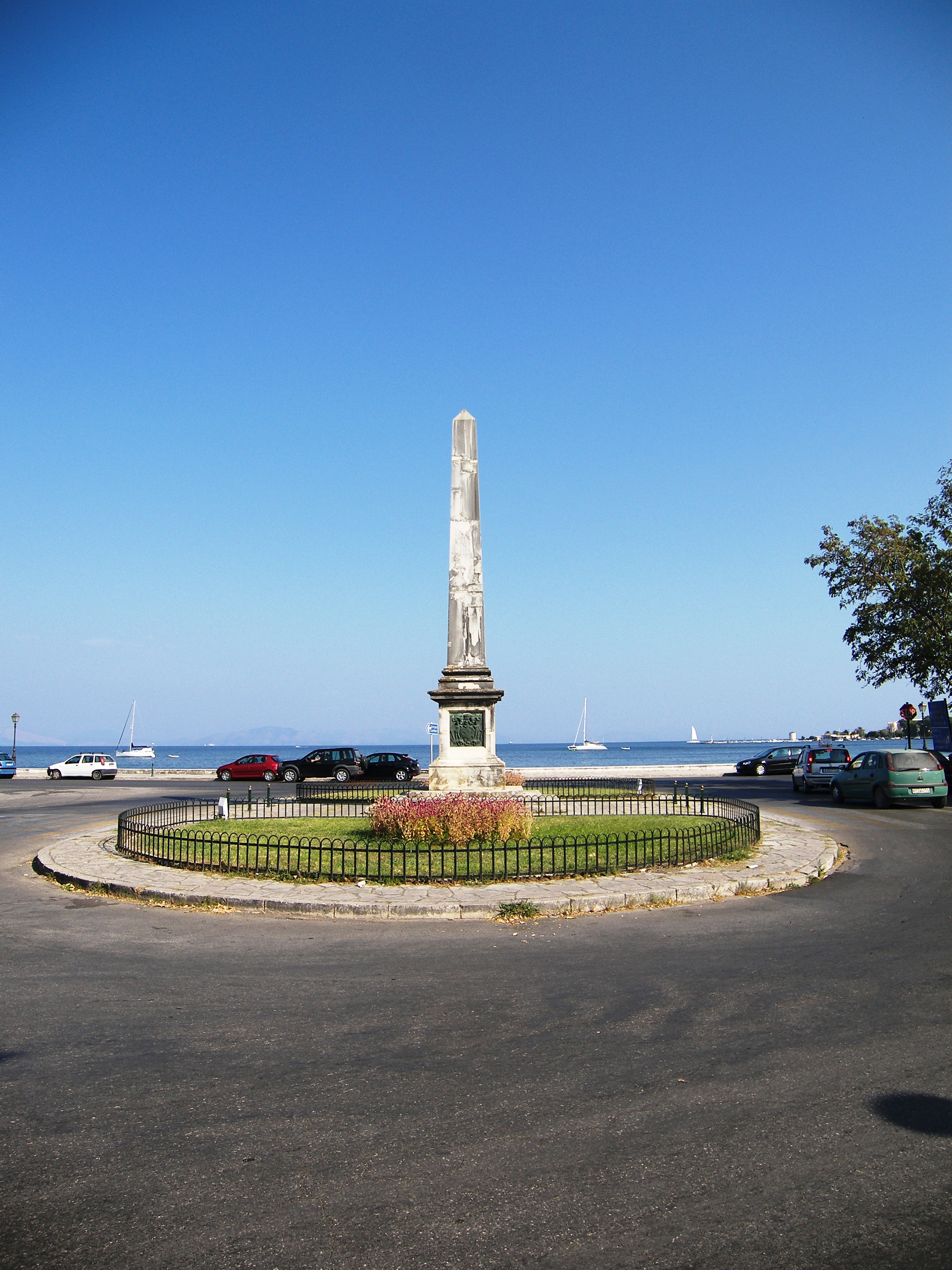
Obelisk commemorating his Ionian service on the island of Corfu

On his return to Europe, he was employed in various missions, and he published about this time Naval Evolutions, a controversial work dealing with the question of breaking the line. From 1835 to 1840 Douglas, then a GCMG, was Lord High Commissioner of the Ionian Islands, where, amongst other reforms, he introduced a new code of laws. In 1837 he became a Lieutenant-General, in 1840 a KCB, in 1841 a civil GCB, and in 1851 a full general. He was given the colonelcy of the 99th (Lanarkshire) Regiment of Foot from 1841 to 1851 when he transferred as colonel to the 15th (the Yorkshire East Riding) Regiment of Foot, a position he held until his death in 1861.

From 1842 to 1847, Douglas sat as a Conservative Member of Parliament (MP) for Liverpool, (Note: Douglas had previously been proposed as a parliamentary candidate for Liverpool in 1832 by Nicholas Robinson but came fourth. He came third when he again attempted to enter parliament in the 1835 election.) where he took a prominent part in debates on military and naval matters and on the corn laws. He was frequently consulted on important military questions.

His later works included Observations on the Modern System of Fortification. and On Naval Warfare With Steam.

== Personal life and death ==
In 1797, while in Quebec City, Douglas fathered a daughter, Margaret (or Marguerite), but did not marry the mother, Catherine Normandeau. In 1799, he returned to England, and in July of that year he married Anne Dundas, daughter of James Dundas. They had ten children, Major Charles Douglas, James Dundas Douglas, Howard Douglas, General Sir Robert Percy Douglas, 4th Baronet of Carr, Reverend William Frederick Douglas, Ann Douglas, Christina Douglas, Lucy Douglas, Sarah Mary Harcourt Douglas, and Mary Douglas.

Sir Howard Douglas died in Tunbridge Wells.

== Honors ==
Douglas was elected a Fellow of the Royal Society, and one of the founders of the Royal Geographical Society. He was awarded an honorary Doctor of Civil Law from the University of Oxford. Shortly before his death, he declined the offer of a military GCB.

His service as Lord High Commissioner of the Ionian Islands is recognized by an obelisk on the island of Corfu.

== Notes ==
Parliament of the United Kingdom
Preceded by Cresswell Cresswell; Viscount Sandon	Member of Parliament for Liverpool; 1842–1847; With: Viscount Sandon	Succeeded by Thomas Bernard Birch; Viscount Sandon
Military offices
Preceded by Sir Henry Watson	Colonel of the 15th (the Yorkshire East Riding) Regiment of Foot; 1851–1861	Succeeded by William Booth
Preceded by Sir Hugh Gough	Colonel of the 99th (Lanarkshire) Regiment of Foot; 1841–1851	Succeeded by Sir John Hanbury
Baronetage of Great Britain
Preceded by William Henry Douglas	Baronet (of Carr); 1809–1861	Succeeded by Robert Percy Douglas
