= February 1880 Liverpool by-election =

UK parliamentary by-election

The February 1880 Liverpool by-election was fought on 6 February 1880. The by-election was fought due to the death of the incumbent Conservative MP, John Torr. It was won by the Conservative candidate Edward Whitley.

Liverpool by-election, February 1880
Party	Candidate	Votes	%	±%
Conservative	Edward Whitley	26,106	52.2	−1.2
Liberal	Lord Ramsay	23,885	47.8	+4.4
Majority		2,221	4.4	+0.3
Turnout		49,991	78.2	+7.8
Registered electors		63,946		
Conservative hold		Swing	-2.8	
