= Giles Brook =

English politician

Giles Brook or Brooke (c. 1553–1614), was an English politician who sat in the House of Commons from 1604 to 1611.

Brook was member of a family that served Liverpool for many years. He was an alderman of Liverpool and was bailiff in 1584. He was Lord Mayor of Liverpool in 1592. In 1604, he was elected Member of Parliament for Liverpool and sat until 1611.

Parliament of England
Preceded by Edward Anderson; Hugh Calverley	Member of Parliament for Liverpool; 1604–1611; With: Thomas Remchinge	Succeeded by Thomas Ireland; Sir Hugh Beeston
