= William Rathbone VI =

English businessman and politician

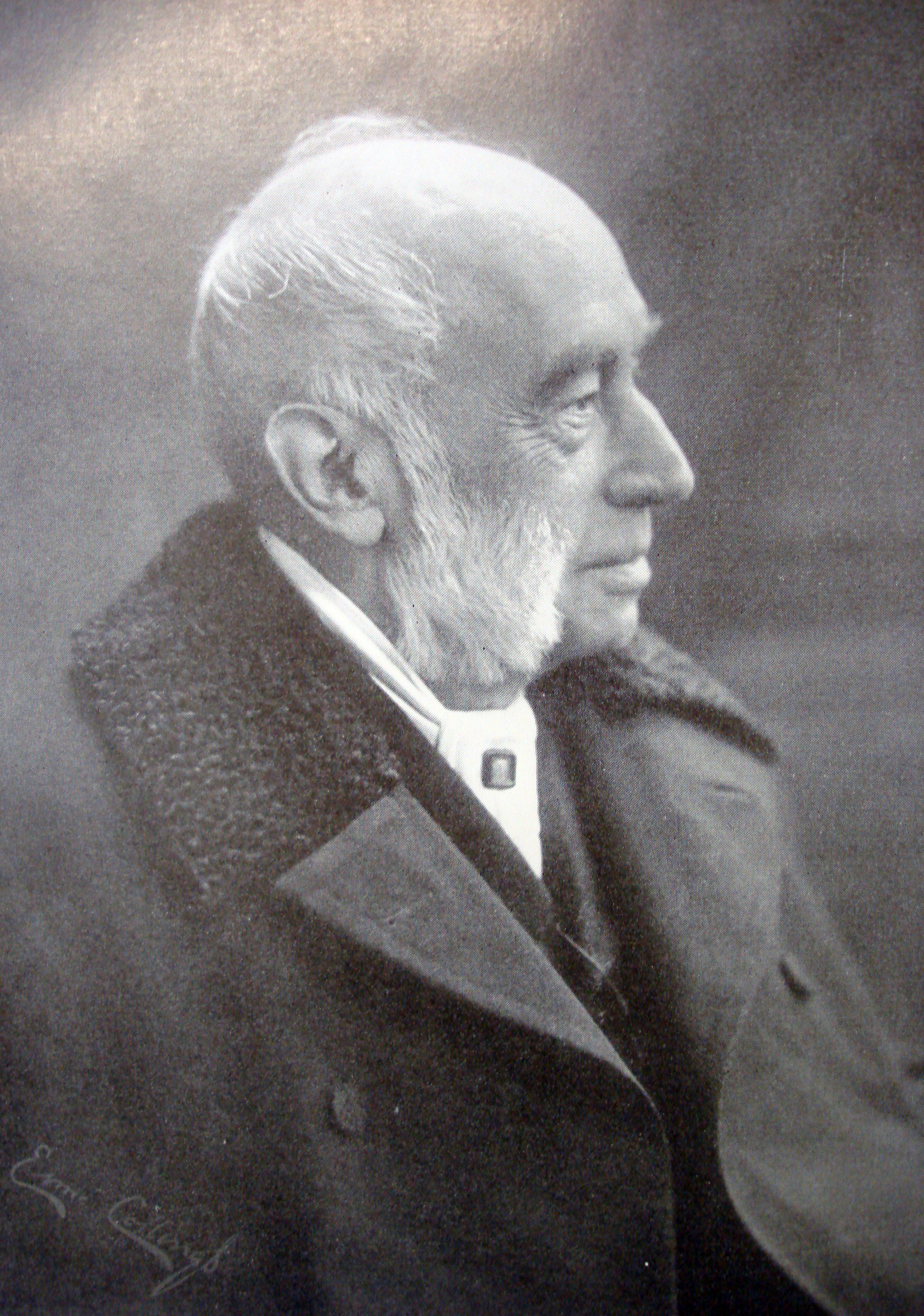
- Contemporary photograph of Rathbone

Member of Parliament for Arfon
- In office 24 November 1885 – 13 July 1895
- Preceded by: Constituency created
- Succeeded by: William Jones

Personal details
- Born: 11 February 1819
- Died: 6 March 1902 (aged 83) Liverpool, England
- Party: Liberal

William Rathbone VI (11 February 1819 – 6 March 1902) was an English merchant and businessman noted for his philanthropic and public work. He was also a Liberal politician who sat in the House of Commons variously between 1868 and 1895.

== Background and early life ==
Rathbone was the eldest son of William Rathbone of Greenbank, Liverpool and his wife Elizabeth Greg, daughter of Samuel Greg of Quarry Bank, Cheshire. He was a member of the noted Rathbone family and spent some time with various companies in Liverpool and London in 1842, becoming a partner in the family company Rathbone Brothers and Co., general merchants of Liverpool. He remained a partner until 1885 and is said to have regarded wealth and business success chiefly as a means to the achievement of public and philanthropic work. He was a Deputy Lieutenant and JP for Lancashire.

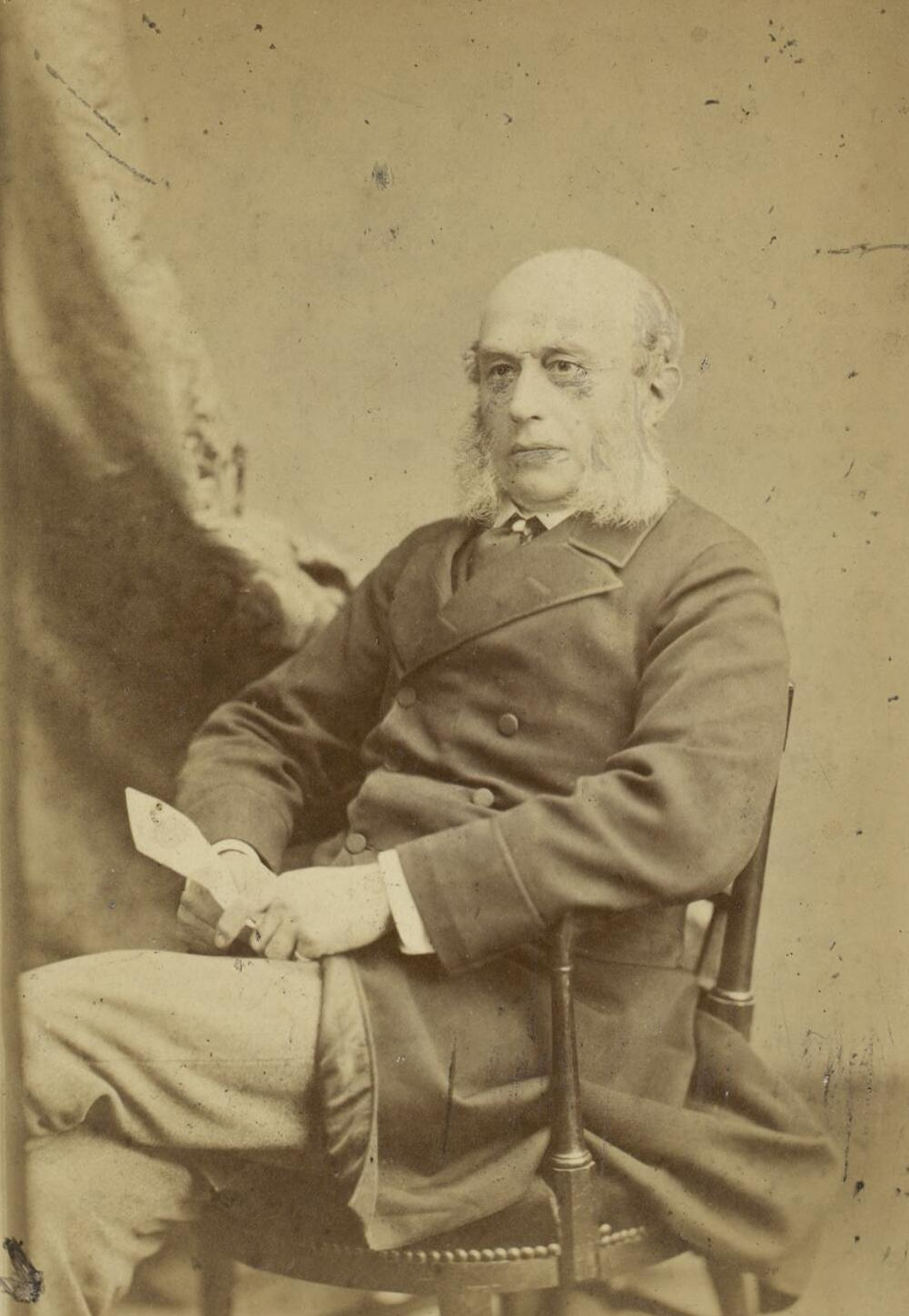
Rathbone, c.1880

== Political and philanthropic work ==
When Rathbone's first wife Lucretia was dying in 1859 she was cared for at home by a private nurse, Mrs Mary Robinson, who had received training at St. Thomas' Hospital London, Seeing the difference a trained nurse could make for a patient in a wealthy household prompted him to pursue bringing such benefits for poor people. Following a three-month experiment with Nurse Robinson providing nursing care in the homes of poor people in one district of Liverpool, he set about creating a philanthropic system of district nursing for poor people in their homes. The involvement of Florence Nightingale led to a close friendship. In 1862, the Liverpool Training School and Home for Nurses was established, from which a district nursing system was implemented in Liverpool through the 1860s and spread throughout the country. His involvement with this scheme also made him aware of the poor state of the workhouse hospitals, and he did much to assist in the reform of nursing in workhouses.

Rathbone was also instrumental in establishing Queen Victoria's Jubilee Institute for Nurses in 1887, which later became The Queen's Nursing Institute and the Queen's Nursing Institute Scotland. The institute was founded using money donated by the women of England for Queen Victoria's Golden Jubilee. Its mission was to organise the training and supply of district nurses throughout the British Isles, with the help of regional bodies. District nurses trained under its auspices were given the title Queen's Nurse. Members of the Rathbone family have served as trustees of the charity continuously ever since.

Rathbone was elected as Member of Parliament (MP) for Liverpool in 1868, and sat for the city until 1880. In 1881, he was elected MP for Carnarvonshire and held the seat until 1885. He was then elected MP for Arfon and held the seat until 1895.

Rathbone was closely involved in the formation of University College Liverpool (1882), which later became the University of Liverpool, founding a Professorship in English with his two brothers, and serving as president of the college in 1892. He also played an important part in the establishment of the University College of North Wales in 1884, and served as president from 1891. He was made Freeman of the City of Liverpool on 21 October 1891.

== Works ==
- Rathbone, William (1869). Local taxation and poor law administration in great cities . Westminster: J.B. Nichols and Sons.
- Rathbone, William (1882). Great Britain and the Suez Canal . London: Chapman and Hall, Limited.

== Personal life ==
Rathbone married firstly Lucretia Wainwright Gair (c.1823 – 27 May 1859), daughter of Samuel Stillman Gair of Liverpool, in 1847. They had five children, but Lucretia died shortly after the birth of the fifth, Ted, who was drowned in a sailing accident on Derwent water in 1886.

Rathbone remarried on 6 February 1862 to Esther Emily Acheson Lyle (c.1832 – 19 March 1918), daughter of Acheson Lyle of Derry. They had six children, including the campaigner and politician, Eleanor Rathbone and Emily Evelyn (Evie) (1865–1954) who married Hugh Reynolds Rathbone. Rathbone died on 6 March 1902 at his home, Greenbank House in Liverpool.

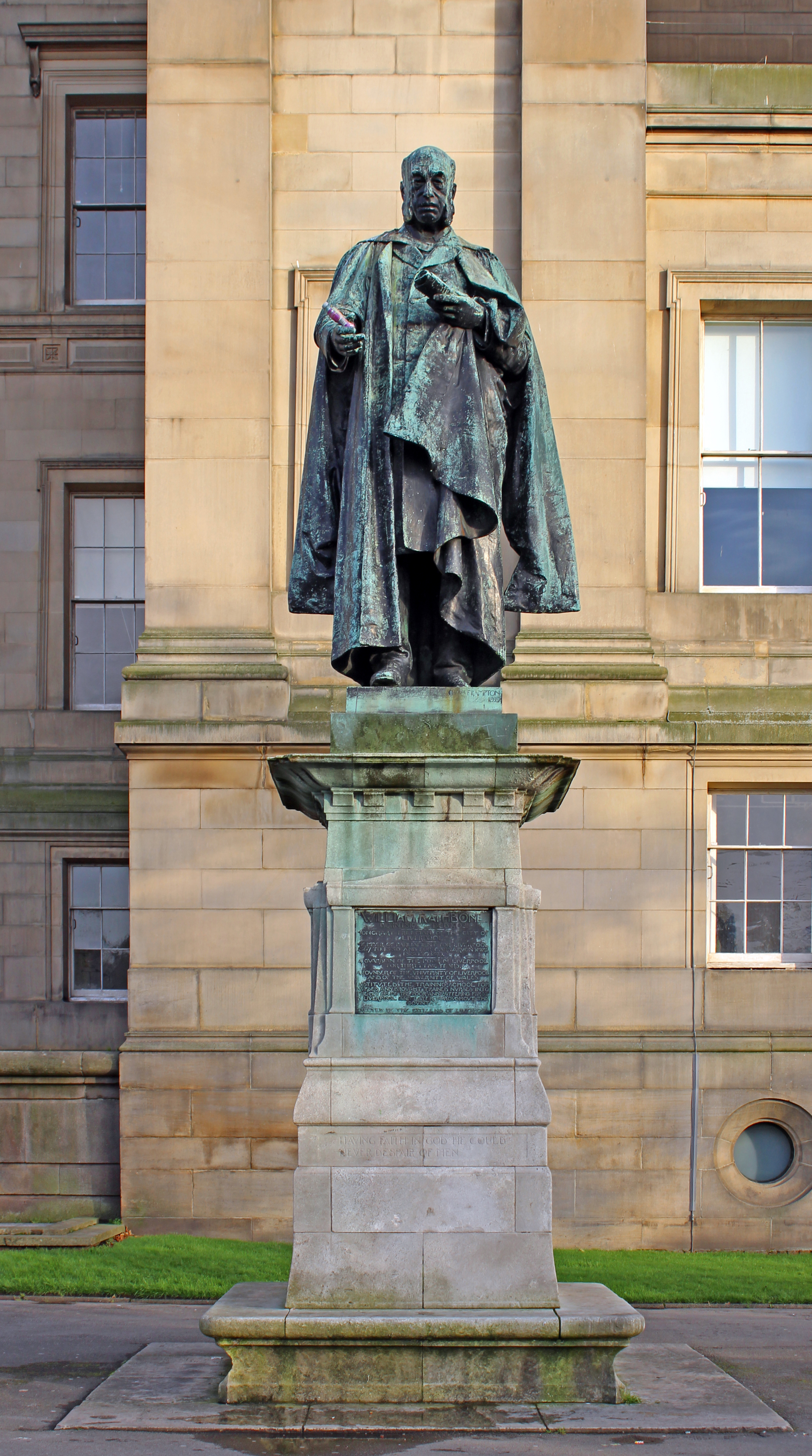
Statue of William Rathbone in St John's Gardens, Liverpool

Parliament of the United Kingdom
| Preceded by Thomas Horsfall; Samuel Robert Graves | Member of Parliament for Liverpool; 1868 – 1880; With: Samuel Robert Graves to 1873; John Torr 1873–1880; Edward Whitley 1880; Viscount Sandon from 1868 | Succeeded by Edward Whitley; Viscount Sandon; John Ramsay |
| Preceded by Watkin Williams | Member of Parliament for Carnarvonshire; 1880 – 1885 | Constituency abolished |
| New constituency | Member of Parliament for Arfon; 1885 – 1895 | Succeeded by William Jones |
