= Dudley Ryder, 3rd Earl of Harrowby =

British peer and politician

The Right Honourable The Earl of Harrowby PC JP DL
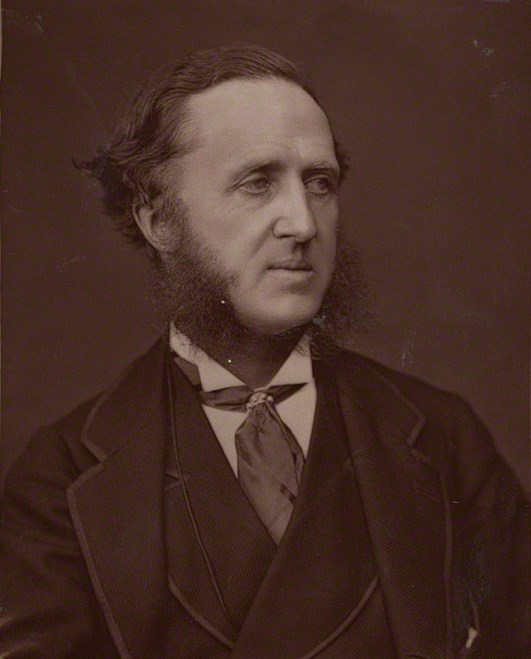

President of the Board of Trade
- In office 4 April 1878 – 21 April 1880
- Monarch: Victoria
- Prime Minister: The Earl of Beaconsfield
- Preceded by: Sir Charles Adderley
- Succeeded by: Joseph Chamberlain

Personal details
- Born: 16 January 1831 Brighton, England
- Died: 26 March 1900 (aged 69) Sandon Hall, Staffordshire, England
- Party: Conservative
- Spouse: Lady Mary Cecil (m. 1861)
- Parent(s): Dudley Ryder, 2nd Earl of Harrowby; Lady Frances Stuart
- Education: Christ Church, Oxford

Dudley Francis Stuart Ryder, 3rd Earl of Harrowby PC JP DL (16 January 1831 – 26 March 1900), known as Viscount Sandon from 1847 to 1882, was a British peer and politician.

== Life ==
He was the second son and eventual heir of Dudley Ryder, 2nd Earl of Harrowby, and Lady Frances Stuart, fourth daughter of John Stuart, 1st Marquess of Bute. He was born at Brighton on 16 January 1831. He was educated at Harrow and the University of Oxford, where he matriculated from Christ Church on 31 May 1849, graduated B.A. in 1853, and proceeded M.A. in 1878.

On leaving the university, Viscount Sandon, as he was styled during his father's lifetime, made a tour in the East with Henry Herbert, 4th Earl of Carnarvon, visiting Syria and the Lebanon (see Carnavon's Recollections of the Druses of the Lebanon, London, 1860, 8vo). On his return to England, he did garrison duty as captain in the 2nd Staffordshire militia regiment, during the Crimean War and Indian mutiny.

== Political career ==
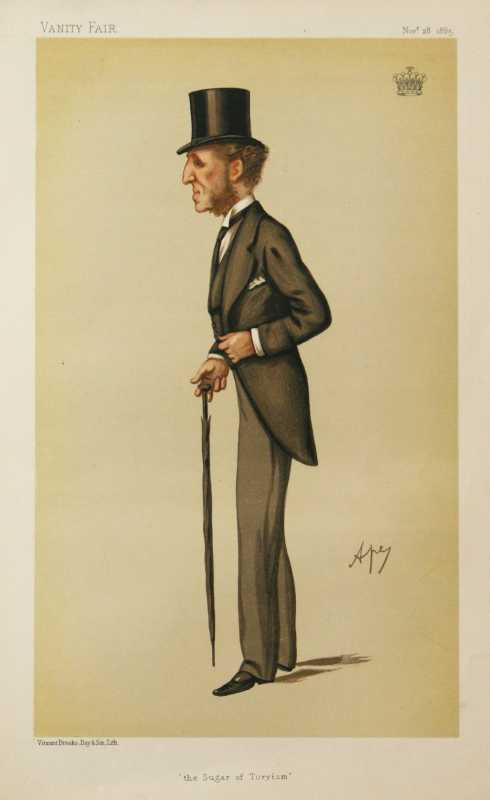
The Earl of Harrowby caricatured by Ape (Carlo Pellegrini) in 1885.

Harrowby was Member of Parliament (MP) for Lichfield from 1856 to 1859 and for Liverpool from 1868 until he succeeded to the peerage in 1882. He gained experience of affairs as private secretary to Henry Labouchere at the colonial office.

He was a member of the select committees on the Hudson's Bay Company (1857) and the Euphrates Valley (1871–72), and continued throughout life to devote much time and attention to the study of imperial and colonial questions. He was Vice-President of the Committee on Education from 1874 to 1878, and President of the Board of Trade (with a seat in the cabinet) from 1878 to 1880 in Benjamin Disraeli's second administration and was sworn of the Privy Council in 1874. Between 1885 and 1886, he served as Lord Privy Seal in Lord Salisbury's first government.

Apart from his career in national politics he was also Chairman of the Staffordshire county council and a Deputy Lieutenant and Justice of the Peace for that county.

He died at Sandon Hall, Staffordshire, on 26 March 1900.

== Family ==
Lord Harrowby married Lady Mary Cecil, daughter of Brownlow Cecil, 2nd Marquess of Exeter, in 1861. The marriage was childless. Harrowby died in March 1900, aged 69, and was succeeded by his younger brother, Henry. Lady Harrowby died in July 1917.

Parliament of the United Kingdom
Preceded by The Lord Waterpark; Lord Alfred Paget	Member of Parliament for Lichfield; 1856–1859; With: Lord Alfred Paget	Succeeded by Lord Alfred Paget; Hon. Augustus Anson
Preceded by Thomas Berry Horsfall; Samuel Robert Graves	Member of Parliament for Liverpool; 1868–1882; With: Samuel Robert Graves 1868–1873; William Rathbone 1868–1880; John Torr 1873–1880; Edward Whitley1880–1882; John Ramsay 1880; Lord Claud Hamilton 1880	Succeeded by Edward Whitley; Lord Claud Hamilton; Samuel Smith
Political offices
Preceded by William Edward Forster	Vice-President of the Committee on Education; 1874–1878	Succeeded by Lord George Hamilton
Preceded by Sir Charles Adderley	President of the Board of Trade; 1878–1880	Succeeded by Joseph Chamberlain
Preceded by The Earl of Rosebery	Lord Privy Seal; 1885–1886	Succeeded by William Ewart Gladstone
Peerage of the United Kingdom
Preceded by Dudley Ryder	Earl of Harrowby; 1882–1900	Succeeded by Henry Ryder
