= 1853 Liverpool by-election =

UK parliamentary by-election

The 1853 Liverpool by-election was held due to the previous election of two Conservative MPs being declared void. It resulted in the election of the Conservative MPs Charles Turner and Thomas Horsfall.

Liverpool by-election, 1853 (2 seats)
Party	Candidate	Votes	%	±%
Conservative	Thomas Horsfall	6,034	34.4	+5.6
Conservative	Henry Thomas Liddell	5,543	31.6	+4.2
Liberal	Sir Thomas Erskine Perry	4,673	26.7	+5.6
Ind. Conservative	J B Moore	1,274	7.3	New
Majority		870	4.9	+0.1
Turnout		17,524	64.7	−1.9
Registered electors		16,182		
Conservative hold		Swing	+1.4	
Conservative hold		Swing	+0.7	
