= 1855 Liverpool by-election =

UK parliamentary by-election

The 1855 Liverpool by-election was held on 29 March 1855 after the incumbent Conservative MP Henry Liddell succeeded to the peerage as Baron Ravensworth. The election was won by the Whig candidate Joseph Christopher Ewart.

Liverpool by-election, 1855
Party	Candidate	Votes	%	±%
Whig	Joseph Christopher Ewart	5,718	57.3	+36.2
Conservative	S G Bonham	4,262	42.7	−13.5
Majority		1,456	14.6	N/A
Turnout		9,980	56.1	−10.5
Registered electors		17,795		
Whig gain from Conservative		Swing	+24.9	
