= 1882 Liverpool by-election =

UK Parliamentary by-election

The 1882 Liverpool by-election was held on 8 December 1882 when the incumbent Conservative MP, Dudley Ryder succeeded to the peerage as Earl of Harrowby. It was won by the Liberal candidate Samuel Smith. The constituency was abolished in November 1885, so the gain was not retained.

Liverpool by-election, 1882
Party	Candidate	Votes	%	±%
Liberal	Samuel Smith	18,198	50.4	N/A
Conservative	Arthur Bower Forwood	17,889	49.6	N/A
Majority		309	0.8	N/A
Turnout		36,087	N/A	N/A
Registered electors		62,039		
Liberal gain from Conservative		Swing	N/A	
