= Edward Whitley (politician) =

English solicitor and Conservative politician

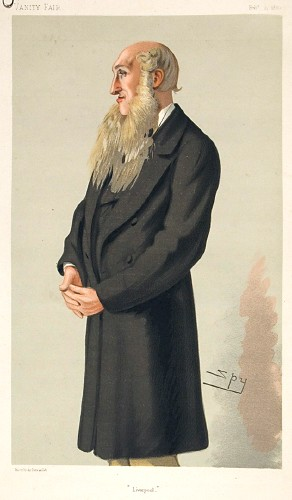
"Liverpool". Caricature by Spy published in Vanity Fair in 1880.

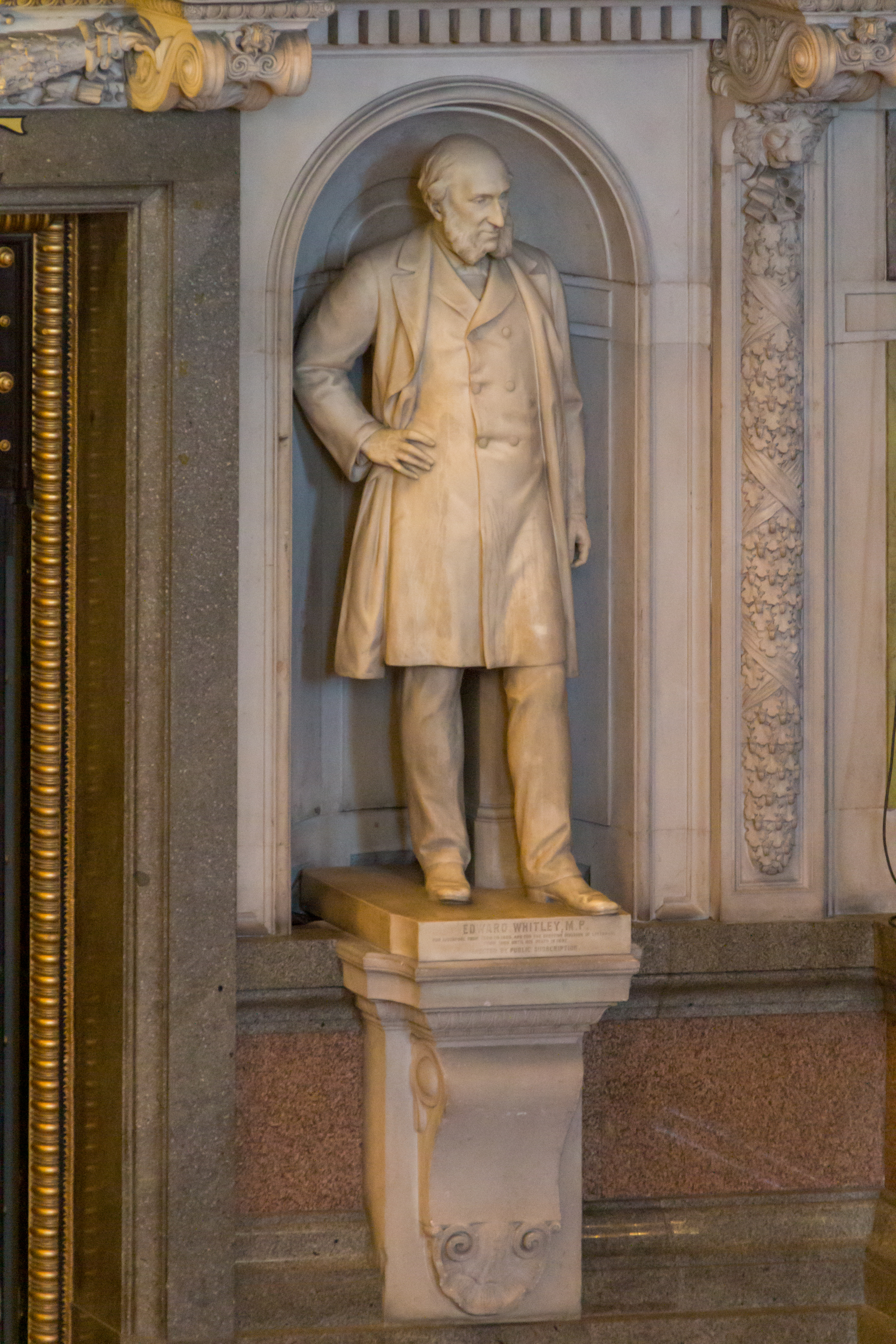
Statue in St George's Hall, Liverpool.

Edward Ewart Whitley (1825 – 14 January 1892) was an English solicitor and Conservative politician who sat in the House of Commons from 1880 to 1892.

== Biography ==
Whitley was the son of John Whitley of Liverpool and his wife Isabella Greenall, and a nephew of the Conservative politician Gilbert Greenall. He was educated at Rugby School and admitted a solicitor in 1849. He became a senior partner in the legal firm of Whitley, Maddock, Hampson, & Castle, of Liverpool. He became a member of the Corporation of Liverpool in 1866, and was Mayor of Liverpool in 1868. He became a J. P. for Liverpool.

In 1880 Whitley was elected as one of three Members of Parliament (MPs) for Liverpool and held the seat until the Redistribution of Seats Act 1885. He was then elected MP for Everton, which he held until his death aged 66. He was buried in Alvanley Churchyard, near Helsby in Cheshire.

In 1878 Whitley married Elizabeth Eleanor Walker. His residences were The Grange, Halewood, near Liverpool and 185 Piccadilly.

Whitley is commemorated by Whitley Street in Liverpool, and by a triangular piece of rocky ground in Everton called Whitley Gardens.

There is a statue of Edward Whitley in St George's Hall, Liverpool.

== Children ==
Edward had five children, including Herbert Whitley and brother William, who moved to Devon with their mother and sister, Mary, following their father's death. Eldest son Edward Jr remained in Liverpool pursuing his medical career.

Herbert founded Paignton Zoo, and his work continues through his trust - now the Wild Planet Trust but formerly the Whitley Wildlife Conservation Trust - which still run a number of wildlife-focused attractions in the South West.

Edward's youngest son, Charles Whitley, was killed in 1917 during the Battle of Arras whilst serving with the King's Royal Rifle Corps, having been awarded the Military Cross the previous year for conspicuous gallantry.

Parliament of the United Kingdom
Preceded by John Torr; Viscount Sandon; William Rathbone	Member of Parliament for Liverpool; 1880 – 1885; With: Viscount Sandon to 1882; William Rathbone to 1880; John Ramsay 1880; Samuel Smith from 1882; Lord Claud Hamilton from 1880	Constituency abolished
New constituency	Member of Parliament for Liverpool Everton; 1885 – 1892	Succeeded by John Archibald Willox
