= John Molyneux (Liverpool MP) =

English politician

John Molyneux (fl. 1584), of Croxteth and New Hall, Lancashire, was an English politician.

He was a member (MP) of the parliament of England for Liverpool in 1584.
