= Samuel Robert Graves =

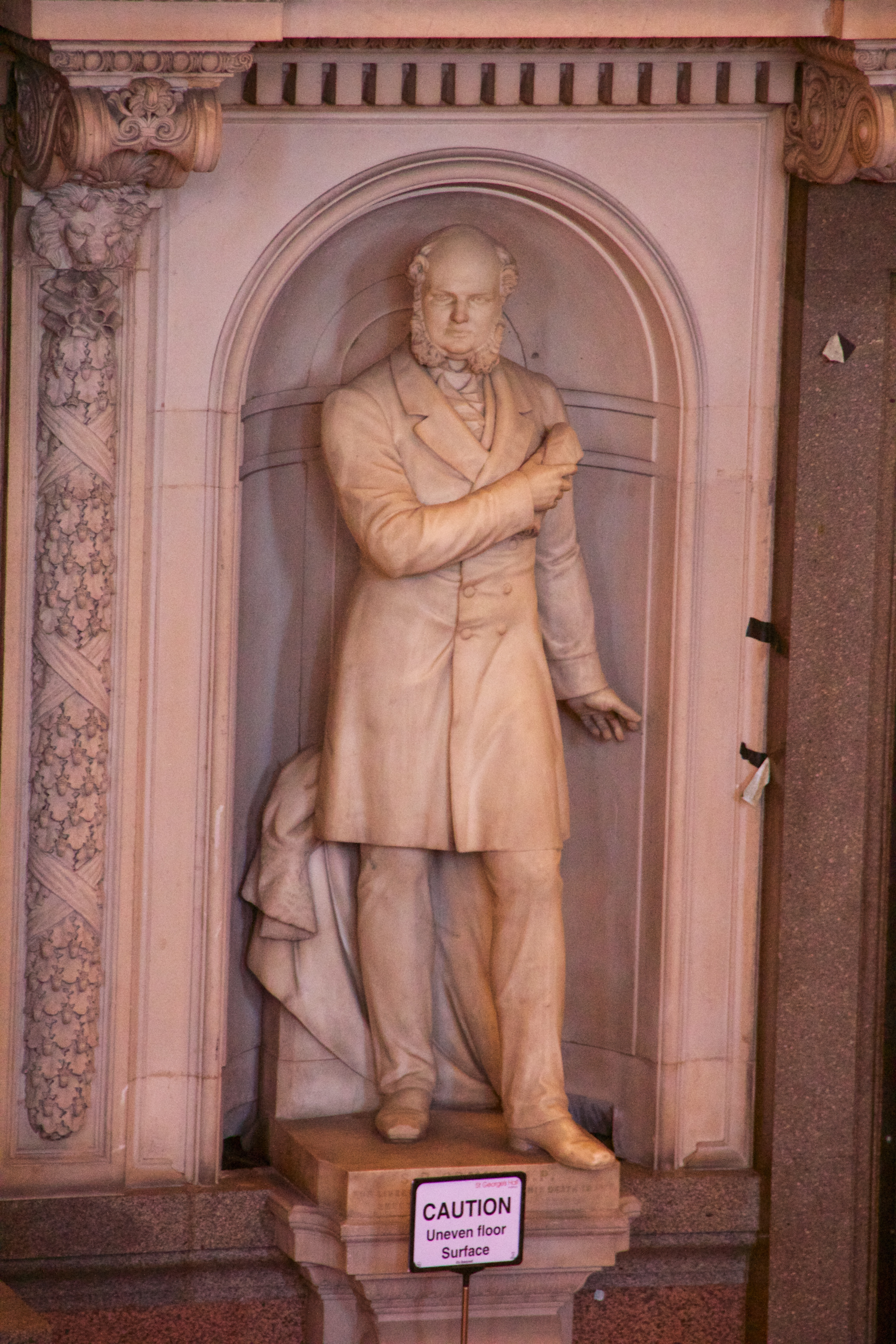
Statue in St George's Hall, Liverpool

Samuel Robert Graves (7 June 1818 – 18 January 1873) was an Irish-born businessman and Conservative politician who sat in the House of Commons of the United Kingdom from 1865 to 1873.

Graves was the son of William Graves and his wife Sarah Elly daughter of Samuel Elly of New Ross. He was educated at a private school at New Ross. He was a merchant and shipowner, and a director of the London and North Western Railway. In 1861 he was mayor of Liverpool. He was a Member of the Royal Commission to inquire into the management of Lights, Buoys, and Beacons. He was commodore of the Royal Mersey Yacht Club and author of "National Dangers," and " A Cruise in the Baltic."

At the 1865 general election Graves was elected Member of Parliament for Liverpool. He held the seat until his death in 1873.

Graves married Elizabeth Haughton, daughter of Samuel Haughton of Burrin House, Carlow in 1848.

Graves died at the age of 54 and is buried in Toxteth Park Cemetery.

== See also ==
- List of statues and sculptures in Liverpool

Parliament of the United Kingdom
Preceded by Thomas Horsfall; Joseph Christopher Ewart	Member of Parliament for Liverpool; 1865 – 1873; With: Thomas Horsfall to 1868; Viscount Sandon from 1868; William Rathbone from 1868	Succeeded by Viscount Sandon; William Rathbone; John Torr
