= 1842 Liverpool by-election =

UK parliamentary by-election

The 1842 Liverpool by-election was held on 8 February 1842 and resulted in the election of the unopposed Conservative candidate Howard Douglas. It was caused by the resignation of the previous Conservative MP, Cresswell Cresswell, when he was made a judge of the Court of Common Pleas by the Prime Minister Robert Peel.
