= John Beaumont (by 1508 – between 1558 and 1564) =

English politician

John Beaumont (by 1508 – between 1558 and 1564), of Thringstone and Gracedieu, Leicestershire and London, was an English politician.

He was a member (MP) of the Parliament of England for Leicester in 1539 and 1542, Bossiney in April 1554, and Liverpool in November 1554 and 1555.
