= John Torr =

UK politician (1813–1880)

John Torr MP

Member of Parliament for Liverpool
- In office 10 February 1873 – 16 January 1880 Serving with Dudley Ryder; William Rathbone
- Preceded by: Samuel Robert Graves; Dudley Ryder; William Rathbone
- Succeeded by: Dudley Ryder; William Rathbone; Edward Whitley

Personal details
- Born: 1813
- Died: 16 January 1880 (aged 66)
- Party: Conservative
- Relatives: Dona Torr (granddaughter)

John Torr (1813 – 16 January 1880) was a Conservative Party politician.

He was elected Conservative MP for Liverpool at a by-election in 1873 and held the seat until his death shortly before the next general election in 1880.

Parliament of the United Kingdom
Preceded by Samuel Robert Graves; Dudley Ryder; William Rathbone	Member of Parliament for Liverpool; 1873–1880; With: Dudley Ryder; William Rathbone	Succeeded by Dudley Ryder; William Rathbone; Edward Whitley
