= Joseph Christopher Ewart =

British politician (1799–1868)

Member of Parliament for Liverpool
- In office 29 March 1855 – 15 July 1865 Serving with Thomas Horsfall
- Preceded by: Thomas Horsfall; Henry Liddell
- Succeeded by: Thomas Horsfall; Samuel Robert Graves

Personal details
- Born: 1799
- Died: 14 December 1868 (aged 69)
- Party: Liberal
- Other political affiliations: Whig

Joseph Christopher Ewart (1799 – 14 December 1868) was a British Liberal and Whig politician.

He was elected Whig MP for Liverpool at a by-election in 1855—caused by the succession of Henry Liddell to 2nd Baron Ravensworth—and held the seat until 1865 when he was defeated.

He was the third son of William Ewart, a Scottish-born Liverpool merchant. William Ewart was a close friend of another Scottish merchant, John (later Sir John) Gladstone, and the namesake of John's son - William Ewart Gladstone, the Victorian statesman and four times Prime Minister.

Parliament of the United Kingdom
Preceded by Thomas Horsfall; Henry Liddell	Member of Parliament for Liverpool; 1855–1865; With: Thomas Horsfall	Succeeded by Thomas Horsfall; Samuel Robert Graves
