= Richard Barnewall =

English lawyer and law reporter

Richard Vaughan Barnewall (1779/1780 – 29 January 1842) was an English lawyer and law reporter.

He was the fourth son of Robert, a London merchant reputedly descended from fifteenth century Irish chief justice Sir Nicholas Barnewall, and Sophia, daughter of Captain Silvester Barnewall, himself uncle to Robert Barnewall. The Baronies of Trimlestown and Kingsland were held by various members of his family.

Barnewall was a lifelong Roman Catholic, educated at Stonyhurst College and the University of Edinburgh. A pupil of Richard Blick, a notable special pleader, Barnewall was called to the bar at the Inner Temple in 1806. He began his practice on the home circuit and at the Surrey quarter sessions.

Barnewall is best remembered as a careful and accurate reporter of the King's Bench, particularly in association with:

- Edward Hall Alderson, (1817–1822);
- Sir Cresswell Cresswell, (1822–1830); and
- John Leycester Adolphus, (1830–1834).

Barnewell retired in 1834, having inherited property from the baroness de Montesquieu. He died at his chambers at 13 King's Bench Walk, never having married, being buried in Paddington churchyard.

== Bibliography ==
- Obituaries:
  - Annual Register (1842), 247–8
  - Gentleman's Magazine, 2nd ser., 17 (1842) 331–2

- [Anon.] (1930) Stonyhurst Magazine, 20(285), Feb
- Burke, B. (1883). A Genealogical History of the Dormant, Abeyant, Forfeited and Extinct Peerages of the British Empire (new ed.). pp. 23–4.
- Dodd, C. R. (1843). The Annual Biography: Being Lives of Eminent or Remarkable Persons, Who have Died within the Year MDCCCXLII. pp. 34–7.
- Lodge, J. (1754). The Peerage of Ireland. Vol. 2. pp. 45–55.
- Rigg, J. M. (2004) "Barnewall, Richard Vaughan (1779/80–1842)", rev. Jonathan Harris, Oxford Dictionary of National Biography, Oxford University Press, accessed 8 August 2007 (subscription required)
