= Richard Sherborn =

16th-century English politician

Sir Richard Sherborn (by 1522–94), of Stonyhurst, Lancashire, was an English politician.

He was a member (MP) of the parliament of England for Lancashire in October 1553, Preston in November 1554 and 1558, and Liverpool in 1555.
