= Thomas Erskine Perry =

British Liberal politician and judge

Sir Thomas Erskine Perry

Personal details
- Born: 20 July 1806 Wimbledon, Surrey, England
- Died: 22 April 1882 (aged 75) London, England
- Party: Liberal
- Relations: James Perry (father)
- Education: Trinity College, Cambridge
- Occupation: Politician, judge

Sir Thomas Erskine Perry (20 July 1806 – 22 April 1882) was a British Liberal politician and judge in India. After serving as Chief Justice of Bombay Supreme Court and as a Member of Parliament in Britain, he served as a member of the Council of India for 21 years.

== Early and personal life ==
Perry was born in Wimbledon to James Perry and his wife, Anne, in 1806. He was educated at Charterhouse School and Trinity College, Cambridge, before studying in Munich. Perry unsuccessfully stood for the seat of Chatham at the 1832 general election.

Perry married Louisa McElkiney in 1834. After her death in India in 1841, he married Elizabeth Margaret Vanden-Bempde-Johnstone, second daughter of Sir John Vanden-Bempde-Johnstone, Bt, in 1855.

== Career ==
Perry was admitted to Lincoln's Inn in 1827 before moving to the Inner Temple in 1832. He was called to the bar in 1834 and worked as a law reporter. He was appointed to serve as a judge of the supreme court in Bombay and was knighted in February 1841. He served as chief justice from 1847 to 1852, and he was president of the Indian board of education for ten years. He also lectured on law outside of court, and his support for educational and employment opportunities for Indians meant a professorship, the Perry Professorship of Jurisprudence, at the Government Law School at Elphinstone was established in 1855 in his honour. He translated Friedrich Carl von Savigny's work on Roman law.

After returning to England, Perry stood for Liverpool in the 1853 by-election. Again unsuccessful, he gained the seat of Devonport in 1854. He spoke in the House of Commons on the East India Company's rule in India and property rights for married women. He left parliament in 1859 following his appointment to the Council of India, on which he served until 1882.

After falling ill and being unable to be sworn of the Privy Council, Perry died in 1882 in London.

== Works ==
- (trans.) Von Savigny's Treatise on possession, or, The jus possessionis of the civil law translated from the German, 1848
- Cases illustrative of oriental life and the application of English law to India, decided in H. M. Supreme Court at Bombay, 1853

== Footnotes ==
Parliament of the United Kingdom
Preceded by Henry Tufnell; George Berkeley	Member of Parliament for Devonport; 1854–1859; With: George Berkeley 1854–1857; James Wilson 1857–1859	Succeeded by James Wilson; Michael Seymour
