= Liverpool (UK Parliament constituency) =

Parliamentary constituency in the United Kingdom, 1868–1885

- Former borough constituency for the House of Commons
- County: Lancashire

1295–1885
- Seats: 1295–1868: Two; 1868–1885: Three
- Replaced by: Abercromby, East Toxteth, Everton, Exchange, Kirkdale, Scotland, Walton, West Derby and West Toxteth

Liverpool was a borough constituency in the county of Lancashire of the House of Commons for the Parliament of England to 1706 then of the Parliament of Great Britain from 1707 to 1800 and of the Parliament of the United Kingdom from 1801 to 1885. It was represented by two Members of Parliament (MPs). In 1868, this was increased to three Members of Parliament.

The borough franchise was held by the freemen of the borough. Each elector had as many votes as there were seats to be filled (plurality block voting). Votes had to be cast by a spoken declaration, in public, at the hustings. In 1800 there were around 3000 electors, with elections in this seat being nearly always contested.

The borough returned several notable Members of Parliament including Prime Minister George Canning, William Huskisson, President of the Board of Trade, Banastre Tarleton, noted soldier in the American War of Independence and most notably, William Roscoe the abolitionist and Anti Slave Trade campaigner.

The constituency was abolished in 1885, the city being split into nine divisions of Abercromby, East Toxteth, Everton, Exchange, Kirkdale, Scotland, Walton, West Derby and West Toxteth.

== History ==
The borough of Liverpool exercised the privilege of sending two members to Parliament in 1295 and 1307, but then for 240 years the right was wholly suspended. In the first Parliament of Edward VI, which met 4 November 1547, though Elective Franchise was restored to the two Lancashire boroughs of Liverpool and Wigan and has since continued almost without further interruption.

Representation was increased to three Members in 1868 and the constituency abolished in 1885, to be replaced by the nine new constituencies of Abercromby, East Toxteth, Everton, Exchange, Kirkdale, Scotland, Walton, West Derby and West Toxteth.

== Members of Parliament ==
=== 1295–1640 ===
Parliament	First member	Second member
1295	Adam fitz Richard	Robert Pinklowe
1300–1307	Richard de la More	John de la More
1545	Nicholas Cutler	Gilbert Gerard
1547	Thomas Stanley	?Francis Cave or Richard Taverner
1553 (Mar)	William Bromley	Ralph Assheton
1553 (Oct)	William Bromley	Sir Giles Alington
1554 (Apr)	William Bromley	Sir William Norris
1554 (Nov)	William Bromley	John Beaumont
1555	Sir Richard Sherborn	John Beaumont
1558	William Stopford	George White
1559 (Jan)	Sir Thomas Smith	Ralph Browne
1562–3	Sir Richard Molyneux	Ralph Sekerston
1571	Thomas Avery	Ralph Sekerston
1572	Ralph Sekerston, died and repl. 1576 by Thomas Greenacres, died and repl. April 1583 by Arthur Atye	Mathew Dale
1584	Arthur Atye	John Molyneux
1586	John Poole	William Cavendish
1588 (Oct)	Edward Warren	Francis Bacon
1593	Michael Doughty	John Wroth
1597 (Oct)	Thomas Gerard	Peter Probie
1601 (Oct)	Edward Anderson	Hugh Calverley
1604	Giles Brook	Thomas Remchinge
1614	Thomas Ireland	Sir Hugh Beeston
1621–1622	Thomas May	William Johnson
1624	Sir Thomas Gerard, 2nd Baronet	George Ireland
1625	Lord Strange	Edward Moore
1626	Edward Bridgeman	Thomas Stanley
1628	Henry Jermyn	John Newdigate
1629–1640	No Parliaments summoned	

=== 1640–1868 ===
Election	First member	First party	Second member	Second party
April 1640	Lord Cranfield		John Holcroft	
November 1640	Sir Richard Wynn, Bt.	Parliamentarian	John Moore	Parliamentarian
December 1648	Wynn excluded in Pride's Purge – seat vacant (Note: Wynn died in July 1649, and a by-election was held to replace him.)		John Moore	Parliamentarian
October 1649	Thomas Birch		John Moore	Parliamentarian
June 1650	Thomas Birch		Moore died June 1650 – seat left vacant	
1653	Liverpool was unrepresented in the Barebones Parliament			
1654	Thomas Birch		Liverpool had only one seat in the First and Second Parliaments of the Protectorate	
1656	Thomas Birch		Liverpool had only one seat in the First and Second Parliaments of the Protectorate	
January 1659	Gilbert Ireland		Thomas Blackmore	
May 1659	Liverpool was unrepresented in the restored Rump			
April 1660	Sir Gilbert Ireland		William Stanley	
1670	Sir Gilbert Ireland		Sir William Bucknall	
1675	William Banks		Sir William Bucknall	
1677	Sir Ralph Assheton, Bt.		Richard Atherton	
1679	Ruisshe Wentworth		John Dubois	
1685	Sir Richard Atherton		Thomas Legh	
1689	Richard Savage, Viscount Colchester	Whig	Thomas Norris	
1694	Thomas Brotherton		Thomas Norris	
January 1695	Thomas Brotherton		Jasper Maudit	
November 1695	Sir William Norris, Bt.		Jasper Maudit	
1698	Sir William Norris, Bt.		William Clayton	
1701 (Dec)	(Sir) Thomas Johnson (Note: Knighted 1708.)	Whig	William Clayton	
1708	(Sir) Thomas Johnson	Whig	Richard Norris	
1710	(Sir) Thomas Johnson	Whig	John Cleiveland	
1713	(Sir) Thomas Johnson	Whig	William Clayton	
1715	(Sir) Thomas Johnson	Whig	Edward Norris	
1722	(Sir) Thomas Johnson	Whig	William Cleiveland	
1723	Langham Booth		William Cleiveland	
April 1724	Langham Booth		Thomas Bootle	
November 1724	Thomas Brereton		Thomas Bootle	
1729	Sir Thomas Aston, Bt.		Thomas Bootle	
1734	Thomas Brereton (Note: Changed his surname to Salusbury on inheriting an estate from his father-in-law in 1734.)		Richard Gildart	
1754	Thomas Brereton		John Hardman	
1755	Thomas Brereton		(Sir) Ellis Cunliffe (Note: Created a baronet, March 1759.)	
1756	Charles Pole		(Sir) Ellis Cunliffe	
1761	Sir William Meredith, Bt.	Tory	(Sir) Ellis Cunliffe	
1767	Sir William Meredith, Bt.	Tory	Richard Pennant	Tory
1780	Bamber Gascoyne	Tory	Henry Rawlinson	
1784	Bamber Gascoyne	Tory	Richard Pennant	Whig
1790	Bamber Gascoyne	Tory	Banastre Tarleton	Tory
1796	Isaac Gascoyne	Tory/Ultra-Tory	Banastre Tarleton	Tory
1806	Isaac Gascoyne	Tory/Ultra-Tory	William Roscoe	Whig
1807	Isaac Gascoyne	Tory/Ultra-Tory	Banastre Tarleton	Tory
1812	Isaac Gascoyne	Tory/Ultra-Tory	George Canning (Note: The future Prime Minister (in 1827), the Right Hon. George Canning was also returned in 1812 for the Irish borough of Sligo. He elected to sit for Liverpool.)	Tory
1823	Isaac Gascoyne	Tory/Ultra-Tory	William Huskisson	Tory
November 1830	Isaac Gascoyne	Tory/Ultra-Tory	William Ewart	Radicals
May 1831	Evelyn Denison (Note: Denison was also elected for Nottinghamshire, which he chose to represent, and never sat for Liverpool.)	Whig	William Ewart	Radicals
October 1831	Dudley Ryder	Tory	William Ewart	Radicals
1834	Dudley Ryder	Conservative	William Ewart	Radicals
1837	Dudley Ryder	Conservative	Cresswell Cresswell	Conservative
1842	Dudley Ryder	Conservative	Howard Douglas	Conservative
1847	Edward Cardwell	Peelite	Sir Thomas Birch, Bt	Whig
1852	Charles Turner	Conservative	William Forbes Mackenzie	Conservative
1853	Thomas Horsfall	Conservative	Henry Liddell	Conservative
1855	Thomas Horsfall	Conservative	Joseph Christopher Ewart	Whig
1859	Thomas Horsfall	Conservative	Joseph Christopher Ewart	Liberal
1865	Thomas Horsfall	Conservative	Samuel Robert Graves	Conservative

=== 1868–1885 ===
- Constituency increased to three Members (1868)

Election	First member	First party	Second member	Second party	Third member	Third party
1868	Samuel Robert Graves	Conservative	Viscount Sandon	Conservative	William Rathbone	Liberal
1873 by-election	John Torr	Conservative	Viscount Sandon	Conservative	William Rathbone	Liberal
Feb 1880 by-election	Edward Whitley	Conservative	Viscount Sandon	Conservative	William Rathbone	Liberal
1880	Edward Whitley	Conservative	Viscount Sandon	Conservative	John Ramsay	Liberal
Aug 1880 by-election	Edward Whitley	Conservative	Viscount Sandon	Conservative	Lord Claud Hamilton	Conservative
1882 by-election	Edward Whitley	Conservative	Samuel Smith	Liberal	Lord Claud Hamilton	Conservative
1885	Constituency abolished (Redistribution of Seats Act 1885)					

== Elections ==
=== Pre-1832 ===
General election 1830: Liverpool (2 seats)
Party	Candidate	Votes	%	±%
Tory	Isaac Gascoyne	191	40.5	
Tory	William Huskisson	188	39.8	
Radical	George Williams	93	19.7	
Majority		95	20.1	
Turnout		c. 283	c. 5.3	
Registered electors		c. 5,350		
Tory hold		Swing		
Tory hold		Swing		

Huskisson's death caused a by-election.

By-election, 30 November 1830: Liverpool
Party	Candidate	Votes	%	±%
Radical	William Ewart	2,215	50.3	+30.6
Whig	Evelyn Denison	2,186	49.7	N/A
Majority		29	0.6	N/A
Turnout		4,401	c. 82.3	c. +77.0
Registered electors		c. 5,350		
Radical gain from Tory		Swing	N/A	

- The by-election was declared void but no new writ was issued before dissolution

General election 1831: Liverpool (2 seats)
Party	Candidate	Votes	%	±%
Radical	William Ewart	1,919	43.5	+23.8
Whig	Evelyn Denison	1,890	42.8	N/A
Tory	Isaac Gascoyne	607	13.7	−66.6
Turnout		2,721	c. 50.9	c. +45.6
Registered electors		c. 5,350		
Majority		29	0.7	N/A
Radical gain from Tory		Swing	+28.9	
Majority		1,283	29.1	N/A
Whig gain from Tory		Swing	N/A	

Denison was also elected for Nottinghamshire and chose to sit there, causing a by-election.

By-election, 21 October 1831: Liverpool
Party	Candidate	Votes	%	±%
Tory	Dudley Ryder	1,519	69.4	+55.7
Radical	Thomas Thornely	670	30.6	−12.9
Majority		849	38.8	N/A
Turnout		2,189	c. 40.9	c. −10.0
Registered electors		c. 5,350		
Tory gain from Whig		Swing	+34.3	

=== 1832–1868 ===
General election 1832: Liverpool (2 seats)
Party	Candidate	Votes	%	±%
Radical	William Ewart	4,931	29.8	+8.1
Tory	Dudley Ryder	4,260	25.8	+19.0
Radical	Thomas Thornely	4,096	24.8	+3.1
Tory	Howard Douglas	3,249	19.6	+12.8
Turnout		8,851	78.4	c. +27.5
Registered electors		11,283		
Majority		671	4.0	+3.3
Radical hold		Swing	−3.9	
Majority		164	1.0	N/A
Tory gain from Whig		Swing	+1.3	

General election 1835: Liverpool (2 seats)
Party	Candidate	Votes	%	±%
Conservative	Dudley Ryder	4,407	27.6	+1.8
Radical	William Ewart	4,075	25.5	−29.1
Conservative	Howard Douglas	3,869	24.2	+4.6
Whig	James Morris	3,627	22.7	N/A
Turnout		8,167	65.4	−13.0
Registered electors		12,492		
Majority		332	2.1	+1.1
Conservative hold		Swing	+8.2	
Majority		206	1.3	−2.7
Radical hold		Swing	−16.2	

General election 1837: Liverpool (2 seats)
Party	Candidate	Votes	%	±%
Conservative	Dudley Ryder	4,786	26.6	−1.0
Conservative	Cresswell Cresswell	4,652	25.8	+1.6
Radical	William Ewart	4,381	24.3	+11.6
Radical	Howard Elphinstone	4,206	23.3	+10.6
Majority		271	1.5	−0.6
Turnout		9,091	81.3	+15.9
Registered electors		11,179		
Conservative hold		Swing	−6.1	
Conservative gain from Radical		Swing	−4.8	

General election 1841: Liverpool (2 seats)
Party	Candidate	Votes	%	±%
Conservative	Dudley Ryder	5,979	28.7	+2.1
Conservative	Cresswell Cresswell	5,792	27.8	+2.0
Whig	Joshua Walmsley	4,647	22.3	N/A
Whig	Henry Temple	4,431	21.3	N/A
Majority		1,145	5.5	+4.0
Turnout		10,425 (est)	67.1 (est)	c. −14.2
Registered electors		15,539		
Conservative hold		Swing	N/A	
Conservative hold		Swing	N/A	

Cresswell resigned after being appointed a judge of the Court of Common Pleas, causing a by-election.

By-election, 8 February 1842: Liverpool
Party	Candidate	Votes	%	±%
Conservative	Howard Douglas	Unopposed		
Conservative hold				

General election 1847: Liverpool (2 seats)
Party	Candidate	Votes	%	±%
Peelite	Edward Cardwell	5,581	32.9	New
Whig	Thomas Birch	4,882	28.8	−14.8
Conservative	Sir Digby Mackworth, 4th Baronet	4,089	24.1	−4.6
Conservative	John Manners	2,413	14.2	−13.6
Turnout		8,483 (est)	49.9 (est)	−17.2
Registered electors		17,004		
Majority		699	4.1	N/A
Peelite gain from Conservative		Swing	N/A	
Majority		793	4.7	N/A
Whig gain from Conservative		Swing	−2.9	

General election 1852: Liverpool (2 seats)
Party	Candidate	Votes	%	±%
Conservative	Charles Turner	6,693	28.8	+4.7
Conservative	William Forbes Mackenzie	6,367	27.4	+13.2
Peelite	Edward Cardwell	5,247	22.6	−10.3
Whig	Joseph Christopher Ewart	4,910	21.1	−7.7
Majority		1,120	4.8	N/A
Turnout		11,609 (est)	66.6 (est)	+16.7
Registered electors		17,433		
Conservative gain from Peelite		Swing	+6.9	
Conservative gain from Whig		Swing	+11.1	

Election declared void on petition, due to bribery and treating by Mackenzie and Turner, causing a by-election.

By-election, 9 July 1853: Liverpool (2 seats)
Party	Candidate	Votes	%	±%
Conservative	Thomas Horsfall	6,034	34.4	+5.6
Conservative	Henry Liddell	5,543	31.6	+4.2
Whig	Thomas Erskine Perry	4,673	26.7	+5.6
Ind. Conservative	John Bramley-Moore	1,274	7.3	New
Majority		870	4.9	+0.1
Turnout		10,462 (est)	64.7 (est)	−1.9
Registered electors		16,182		
Conservative hold		Swing	+1.4	
Conservative hold		Swing	+0.7	

Liddell succeeded to the peerage, becoming 2nd Baron Ravensworth and causing a by-election.

By-election, 29 March 1855: Liverpool
Party	Candidate	Votes	%	±%
Whig	Joseph Christopher Ewart	5,718	57.3	+36.2
Conservative	George Bonham	4,262	42.7	−13.5
Majority		1,456	14.6	N/A
Turnout		9,980	56.1	−10.5
Registered electors		17,795		
Whig gain from Conservative		Swing	+24.9	

General election 1857: Liverpool (2 seats)
Party	Candidate	Votes	%	±%
Conservative	Thomas Horsfall	7,566	36.0	+7.2
Whig	Joseph Christopher Ewart	7,121	33.9	+12.8
Conservative	Charles Turner	6,316	30.1	+2.7
Turnout		10,502 (est)	57.3 (est)	−9.3
Registered electors		18,314		
Majority		445	2.1	−2.7
Conservative hold		Swing	+0.4	
Majority		805	3.8	N/A
Whig gain from Conservative		Swing	+1.5	

General election 1859: Liverpool (2 seats)
Party	Candidate	Votes	%	±%
Liberal	Joseph Christopher Ewart	Unopposed		
Conservative	Thomas Horsfall	Unopposed		
Registered electors		18,779		
Liberal hold				
Conservative hold				

General election 1865: Liverpool (2 seats)
Party	Candidate	Votes	%	±%
Conservative	Thomas Horsfall	7,866	34.9	N/A
Conservative	Samuel Robert Graves	7,500	33.3	N/A
Liberal	Joseph Christopher Ewart	7,160	31.8	N/A
Majority		340	1.5	N/A
Turnout		14,843 (est)	72.0 (est)	N/A
Registered electors		20,618		
Conservative hold		Swing	N/A	
Conservative gain from Liberal		Swing	N/A	

=== 1868–1885 ===
Seat increased to three members

General election 1868: Liverpool (3 seats)
Party	Candidate	Votes	%	±%
Conservative	Samuel Robert Graves	16,766	26.5	−6.8
Conservative	Dudley Ryder	16,222	25.6	−9.3
Liberal	William Rathbone	15,337	24.2	+8.3
Liberal	William Nathaniel Massey	15,017	23.7	+7.8
Majority		885	1.4	−0.1
Turnout		31,671 (est)	79.9 (est)	+7.9
Registered electors		39,645		
Conservative hold		Swing	−7.6	
Conservative hold		Swing	−8.6	
Liberal win (new seat)				

Graves' death caused a by-election.

By-election, 10 February 1873: Liverpool
Party	Candidate	Votes	%	±%
Conservative	John Torr	18,702	52.7	+0.6
Liberal	William Sproston Caine	16,790	47.3	−0.6
Majority		1,912	5.4	+4.0
Turnout		35,492	67.1	−12.8
Registered electors		52,912		
Conservative hold		Swing	+0.6	

General election 1874: Liverpool (3 seats)
Party	Candidate	Votes	%	±%
Conservative	Dudley Ryder	20,206	27.0	+1.4
Conservative	John Torr	19,763	26.4	−0.1
Liberal	William Rathbone	16,706	22.3	−1.9
Liberal	William Sproston Caine	15,801	21.1	−2.6
Lib-Lab	William Shaw Simpson	2,435	3.3	N/A
Majority		3,057	4.1	+2.7
Turnout		38,673 (est)	70.4 (est)	−9.5
Registered electors		54,952		
Conservative hold		Swing	+1.8	
Conservative hold		Swing	−1.2	
Liberal hold		Swing	−1.3	

Ryder was appointed Vice-President of the Committee of the Council on Education, requiring a by-election.

By-election, 14 March 1874: Liverpool
Party	Candidate	Votes	%	±%
Conservative	Dudley Ryder	Unopposed		
Conservative hold				

Torr's death caused a by-election.

By-election, 6 February 1880: Liverpool
Party	Candidate	Votes	%	±%
Conservative	Edward Whitley	26,106	52.2	−1.2
Liberal	John Ramsay	23,885	47.8	+4.4
Majority		2,221	4.4	+0.3
Turnout		49,991	78.2	+7.8
Registered electors		63,946		
Conservative hold		Swing	−2.8	

General election 1880: Liverpool (3 seats)
Party	Candidate	Votes	%	±%
Liberal	John Ramsay	Unopposed		
Conservative	Dudley Ryder	Unopposed		
Conservative	Edward Whitley	Unopposed		
Registered electors		63,946		
Liberal hold				
Conservative hold				
Conservative hold				

Ramsay succeeded to the peerage, becoming Earl of Dalhousie, causing a by-election.

By-election, 9 August 1880: Liverpool
Party	Candidate	Votes	%	±%
Conservative	Claud Hamilton	21,019	52.4	N/A
Liberal	Samuel Plimsoll	19,118	47.6	N/A
Majority		1,901	4.8	N/A
Turnout		40,137	62.8	N/A
Registered electors		63,946		
Conservative gain from Liberal		Swing	N/A	

Ryder succeeded to the peerage, becoming Earl of Harrowby, causing a by-election.

By-election, 11 December 1882: Liverpool
Party	Candidate	Votes	%	±%
Liberal	Samuel Smith	18,198	50.4	N/A
Conservative	Arthur Forwood	17,889	49.6	N/A
Majority		309	0.8	N/A
Turnout		36,087	58.2	N/A
Registered electors		62,039		
Liberal gain from Conservative		Swing	N/A	

== Notes and references ==
Notes

References

- Robert Beatson, A Chronological Register of Both Houses of Parliament (London: Longman, Hurst, Res & Orme, 1807)
- D. Brunton & D. H. Pennington, Members of the Long Parliament (London: George Allen & Unwin, 1954)
- Cobbett's Parliamentary history of England, from the Norman Conquest in 1066 to the year 1803 (London: Thomas Hansard, 1808)
- F. W. S. Craig, British Parliamentary Election Results 1832–1885 (2nd edition, Aldershot: Parliamentary Research Services, 1989)
- J. E. Neale, The Elizabethan House of Commons (London: Jonathan Cape, 1949)
- Leigh Rayment's Historical List of MPs – Constituencies beginning with "L" (part 3)
