= Mary Anne Ewart =

English patron of higher education for women (1830–1911)

Mary Ewart
- Born: 1830; London, England
- Died: 19 February 1911 (aged 80–81); London, England
- Known for: Patron of higher education for women

Mary Anne Ewart (1830 – 19 February 1911) was a British patron of higher education for women. She funded Newnham College and Bedford College, London.

== Life ==
Ewart was born in London and was baptised on 30 December 1830 at St George's, Hanover Square. Her parents were first cousins; her mother was Mary Anne (born Lee) and her father was the politician William Ewart. Her grandfather was also godfather to William Ewart Gladstone.

Her father died in 1869 and left the bulk of his wealth to his son, and two of his daughters were well provided for.

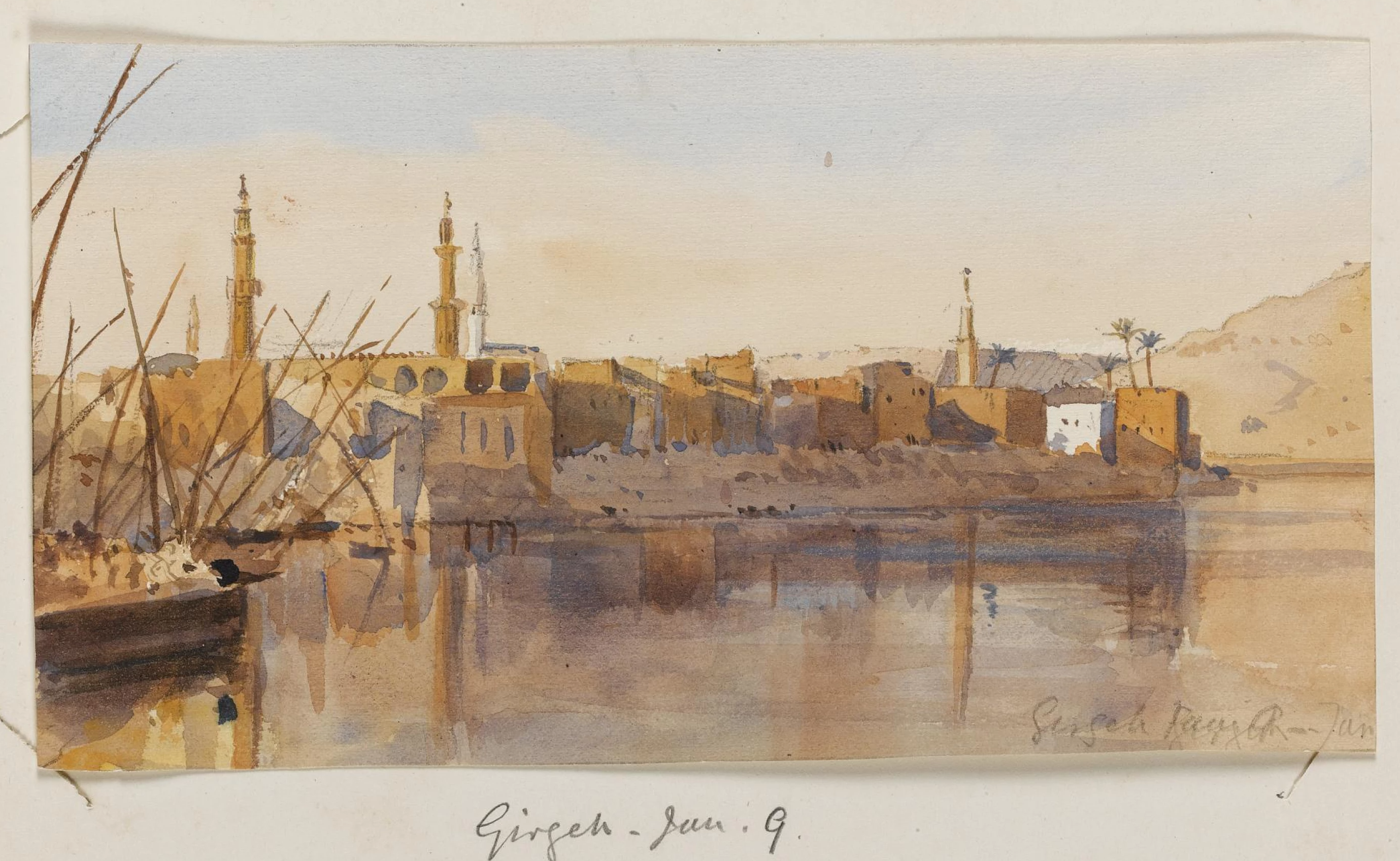
Girzeh, a watercolour by Mary Anne Ewart created in Egypt in 1881

Ewart is noted as a supporter of women's higher education. She was a source of funds and a governor of Newnham College and of Bedford College in London.

She also created and ran a teachers' education loan fund to allow aspiring teachers to gain an education.

In December 1880, she went to Egypt and she spent several months in Cairo and on the Nile where she created 90 watercolours and over 50 photographs. These were pasted into a file which is extant.

In the 1880s, the architect Philip Speakman Webb drew up designs in the Arts and Crafts style for a house for her, Coneyhurst, at Ewhurst, Surrey. The main house design also included details of a gardener's cottage.

== Death and legacy ==
Ewart died in London in 1911. In 2019, a sculpture, "Arc of History", was created for Newnham College by the Haberdashery design studio. The sculpture for the cafe was based on key items taken from the college's archive, recreated in brass and coated steel. Ewart was included because the founding Principal, Anne Jemima Clough, refers to her in an 1890s letter as one of a few friends "specially connected with the College".
