= John Poole (died 1601) =

English politician

John Poole (died 1601), of Capenhurst, Cheshire, was an English politician.

He was a member (MP) of the parliament of England for Liverpool in 1586.
