= August 1880 Liverpool by-election =

UK parliamentary by-election

The August 1880 Liverpool by-election was held on 6 August 1880 after the incumbent Liberal MP, John Ramsay became the Earl of Dalhousie and could no longer sit in the House of Commons. The seat was gained by the Conservative candidate Lord Claud Hamilton.

Liverpool by-election, August 1880
Party	Candidate	Votes	%	±%
Conservative	Lord Claud John Hamilton	21,019	52.4	N/A
Liberal	Samuel Plimsoll	19,118	47.6	N/A
Majority		1,901	4.8	N/A
Turnout		40,137	62.8	N/A
Registered electors		63,946		
Conservative gain from Liberal		Swing	N/A	
