= 1874 Liverpool by-election =

UK Parliamentary by-election

The 1874 Liverpool by-election was fought on 14 March 1874. The by-election was fought due to the incumbent Conservative MP, Viscount Sandon, becoming Vice-President of the Committee of the Council on Education. It was retained by the incumbent.
