= Cresswell Cresswell =

British politician

Sir Cresswell Cresswell, PC (20 August 1794 – 29 July 1863), born Cresswell Easterby, was an English lawyer, judge and Tory politician. As a judge in the newly created divorce court, Cresswell did much to start the emergence of modern family law by setting divorce on a secular footing, removed from the traditional domain of canon law.

== Family ==
Born at Bigg Market, Newcastle, Cresswell's father was Francis Easterby (died 1834), a merchant and sailor. His mother was Frances Dorothea née Cresswell (1768–1832), daughter of a distinguished northern family that could trace its ancestry back to the twelfth century and service in the Crusades. The family owned land in Northumberland and were scions of the Cresswells of Bibury, Sidbury and Sherston Pinkney, ancestors of Edward I. Francis adopted the name Cresswell in 1807 when his wife inherited much of the ancestral wealth.

His brother Addison was the Tory MP for North Northumberland between 1841 and 1857.

== Education ==
Cresswell was educated at Charterhouse School, where he was a contemporary of Connop Thirlwall, George Grote and Henry Havelock. He attended Trinity College and then Emmanuel College, Cambridge, where William Henry Maule was his tutor. Graduating BA in 1814, he received the lowest place in the honours list of the entire university. Nonetheless, he was awarded an MA in 1818 and was called to the bar by the Inner Temple in 1819.

== Early career ==
Cresswell began his practice on the northern circuit and fell under the guidance and mentorship of Henry Brougham. Cresswell found his familiarity with his father's nautical career an advantage in the maritime city of Liverpool and he soon established a reputation in commercial and shipping cases. From 1822 to 1830 he was co-author, with Richard Barnewall, of a well-received series of law reports.

From the 1820s, Brougham's and James Scarlett's energies were directed elsewhere and Cresswell became a leader of the northern circuit, being made recorder of Hull in 1830. In 1834 he was made KC and the same year became Attorney General for the County Palatine of Durham.

Cresswell had gained a reputation as a "violent Tory" but was elected as Conservative Party Member of Parliament for Liverpool in the 1837 United Kingdom general election and again in 1841 when he defeated William Ewart. Cresswell was knighted in 1842. A dedicated party-man who loyally followed Sir Robert Peel, Cresswell made little contribution to parliamentary debate. He resigned his parliamentary seat in 1842 when he was made a judge of the Court of Common Pleas by Peel, being knighted at the same time. Cresswell's contributions to the common law were modest. He was a cautious judge, somewhat in awe of chief justice Tindal, and was all too willing to concur rather than to take the lead.

In 1856 Cresswell sat in the Swynfen will case, the case of a contested will that generated extensive satellite litigation including a claim that the plaintiff's counsel, Sir Frederic Thesiger, had been guilty of malpractice in agreeing a settlement without authority. It was further alleged that Cresswell had induced the agreement by suggesting to Thesiger at an early stage that he had formed an unfavourable view of his client's case. At Thesiger's trial, counsel Charles Rann Kennedy described Cresswell's behaviour as being of a "highly criminal nature" amounting to a "fraud" and a "misdemeanour". Cresswell admitted having shared his impressions with Thesiger saying, "If any gentleman had asked me a question about [the trial] I should have answered him", sharing his adverse opinion. While this case raised some negative publicity, no legal action was taken against Cresswell.

== The divorce court ==
In 1858 he was named the first divorce judge-in-ordinary of the new Probate, Divorce and Matrimonial Causes Court which replaced the jurisdiction of the ecclesiastical courts and created the remedy of civil divorce. He was reputedly offered a peerage at the time but declined. He did, however, become a privy councillor. Appointed with bipartisan support, such was the sensitivity of the office, there was some disquiet that a notoriously bad-tempered, confirmed bachelor had been appointed in such a role but Cresswell succeeded superbly in establishing tone, procedure and practice.

The new law increased petitions for divorce one hundredfold and there were fears of chaos but Cresswell took a managerial role in regulating the new flood of litigation. He showed great sensitivity in dealing with genuine grievances but upheld the sanctity of marriage and was capable of being severe when necessary. However, he was also instrumental in moving the legal view of marriage from that based on a sacrament to that based on contract. He worked with colossal speed and energy, deciding over one thousand cases in six years, only one of which was reversed on appeal. He achieved some public fame and huge respect popularly being held as representing the five million married women of Britain. His activities in this field are referred to in Anthony Trollope's Framley Parsonage; "most marriages are fairly happy, in spite of Sir Cresswell Cresswell".

== Death ==
Cresswell died in office, from complications after a fall from his horse in Constitution Hill, London, and was buried in Kensal Green Cemetery. He was unmarried and had no children so he left his considerable fortune of £35,000 (£2.8 million at 2003 prices) to charity.

== Bibliography ==
- Foss, E. (2006) [1848–64]. A Biographical Dictionary of the Judges of England: From the Conquest to the Present Time 1066–1870. Kessinger. ISBN 1-4286-2959-9., 9.184–7
- Getzler, J. S. (2004) "Cresswell, Sir Cresswell (1793–1863)", Oxford Dictionary of National Biography, Oxford University Press, accessed 12 August 2007 (subscription, Wikipedia Library access or UK public library membership required)
- Manson, E. (1904). The Builders of Our Law During the Reign of Queen Victoria. London: Horace Cox.
- Swabey & Tristram (1858–65) Probate and Divorce Reports, vols.1–4, English Reports, vol.164

Parliament of the United Kingdom
Preceded by William Ewart; Viscount Sandon	Member of Parliament for Liverpool; 1837 – 1842; With: Viscount Sandon	Succeeded by Sir Thomas Birch, Bt; Viscount Sandon
