= Dudley Ryder, 2nd Earl of Harrowby =

British politician

The Right Honourable The Earl of Harrowby KG PC FRS
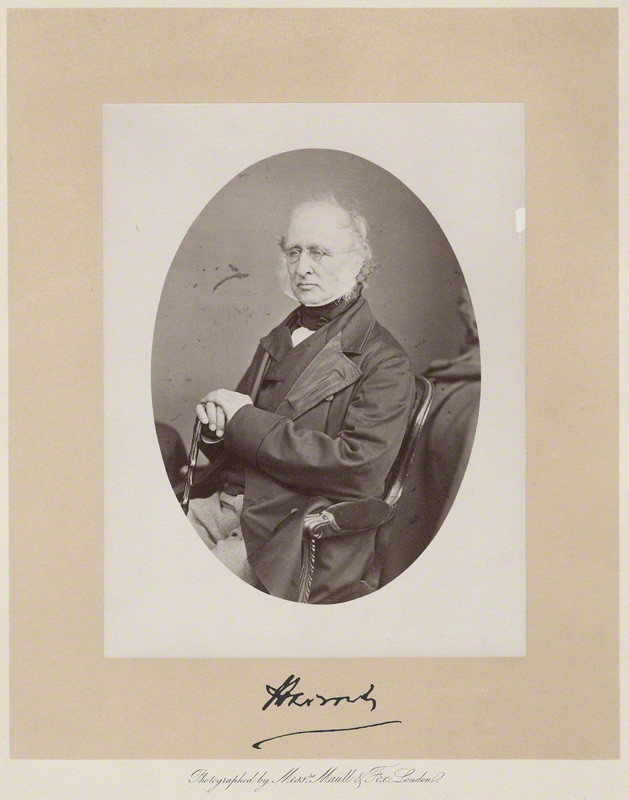

Chancellor of the Duchy of Lancaster
- In office 31 March 1855 – 7 December 1855
- Monarch: Victoria
- Prime Minister: The Viscount Palmerston
- Preceded by: The Earl Granville
- Succeeded by: Matthew Talbot Baines

Lord Privy Seal
- In office 7 December 1855 – 3 February 1858
- Monarch: Victoria
- Prime Minister: The Viscount Palmerston
- Preceded by: The Duke of Argyll
- Succeeded by: The Marquess of Clanricarde

Personal details
- Born: 19 May 1798 London, England
- Died: 19 November 1882 (aged 84) Sandon Hall, Sandon, Staffordshire, England
- Spouse: Lady Frances Stuart (m. 1823; died 1859)
- Children: Dudley Ryder, 3rd Earl of Harrowby; Henry Ryder, 4th Earl of Harrowby
- Parent(s): Dudley Ryder, 1st Earl of Harrowby; Lady Susan Leveson-Gower
- Education: Christ Church, Oxford

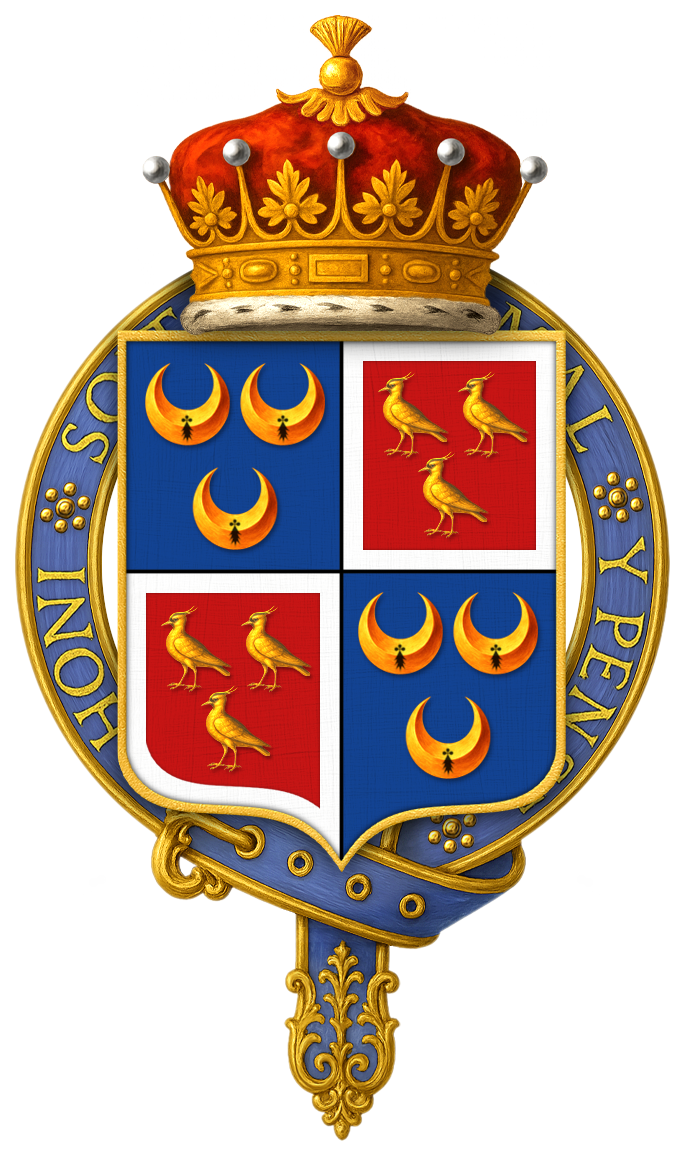
Quartered arms of Dudley Ryder, 2nd Earl of Harrowby, KG, PC, FRS

Dudley Ryder, 2nd Earl of Harrowby (19 May 1798 – 19 November 1882), styled Viscount Sandon between 1809 and 1847, was an English politician. He held office under Lord Palmerston as Chancellor of the Duchy of Lancaster in 1855 and as Lord Privy Seal between 1855 and 1858.

== Background and education ==
Harrowby was born in London, the son of Dudley Ryder, 1st Earl of Harrowby and his wife Lady Susanna Leveson-Gower (1772 - 1838), daughter of Granville Leveson-Gower, 1st Marquess of Stafford. He was educated at Christ Church, Oxford.

He was an officer of the Staffordshire Yeomanry, being commissioned as a lieutenant in the Stafford Troop on 20 December 1819 and being promoted to captain on 26 March 1826. He resigned his commission in March 1831.

== Political career ==
Harrowby was elected Member of Parliament for Tiverton in 1819, a seat he held until 1831 before switching to represent Liverpool until 1847. He served as a Lord of the Admiralty in 1827 and as Secretary to the Board of Control under Lord Grey between 1830 and 1831. He had a London home in Grosvenor Square.

In 1847, he became Earl of Harrowby and took up a seat in the House of Lords. He remained out of office for a long time, but in 1855, eight years after he had succeeded his father as Earl of Harrowby, he was appointed Chancellor of the Duchy of Lancaster by Lord Palmerston, becoming a Privy Counsellor at the same time. In a few months he was transferred to the office of Lord Privy Seal, a position which he resigned in 1858.

He was made a Knight of the Garter in 1859. Harrowby was also three times President of the Royal Statistical Society (1840–1842, 1849–1851, 1855–1857), chairman of the Maynooth commission and a member of other important royal commissions. He was regarded as among the most stalwart and prominent defenders of the Church of England.

== Animal welfare ==
Harrowby campaigned for animal welfare and was president of the Royal Society for the Prevention of Cruelty to Animals (RSPCA) from 1861. In 1864, he met Henry Bergh who had visited England and helped him with the formulation of ASPCA's policies. Harrowby was President of the RSPCA until 1878; he was succeeded by Lord Aberdare. Unlike Abderdare, Harrowby was sympathetic to the cause of anti-vivisection.

Thomas Jackson's animal welfare book Our Dumb Companions (1864) was dedicated to Harrowby.

== Marriage and children ==
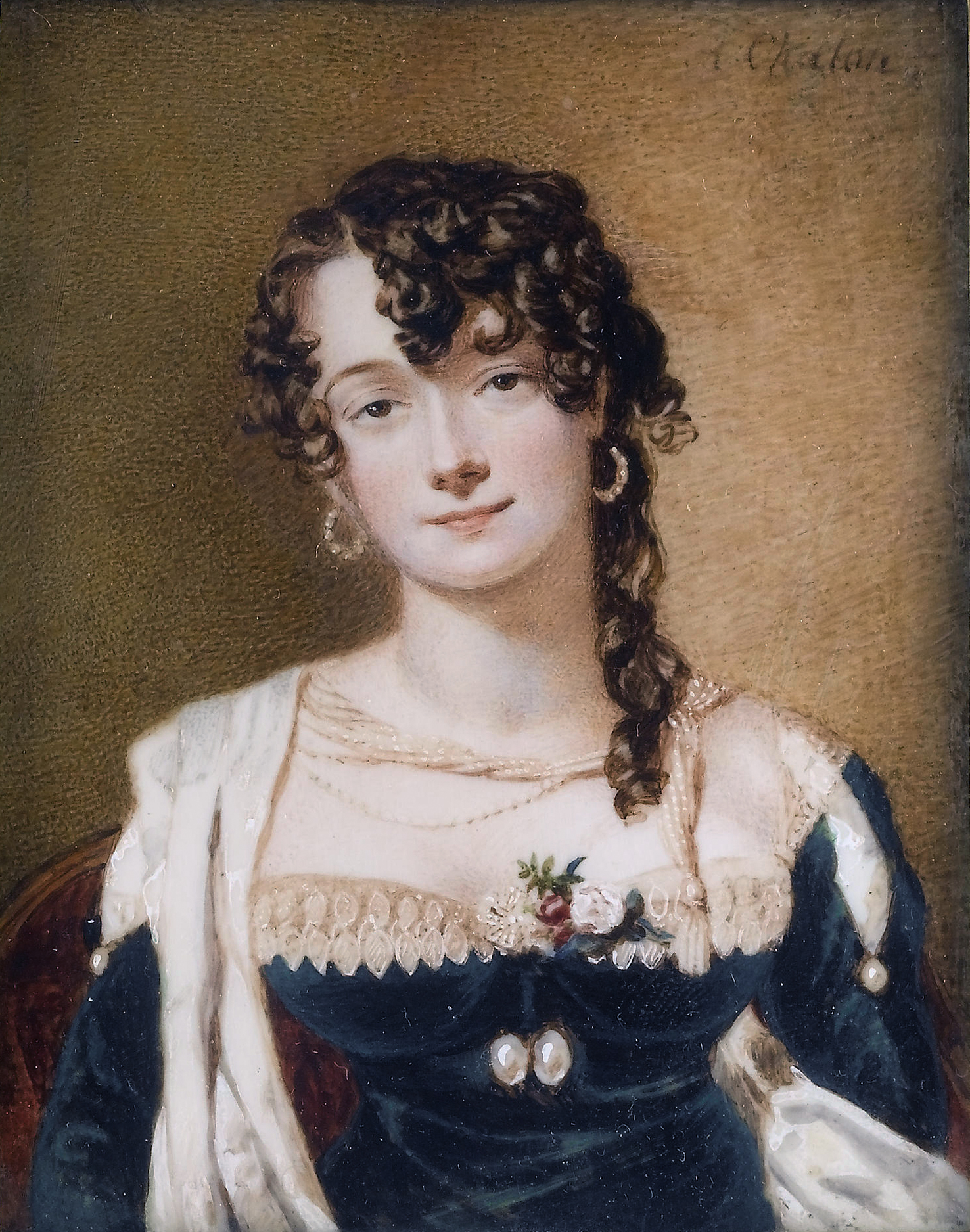
Frances Stuart

Lord Harrowby married Lady Frances Stuart, daughter of John Stuart, 1st Marquess of Bute, on 15 September 1823. They had two sons:

- Dudley Francis Stuart Ryder, 3rd Earl of Harrowby (16 January 1831 - 26 March 1900)
- Henry Dudley Ryder, 4th Earl of Harrowby (3 May 1836 - 11 December 1900)

== Death ==
Lady Harrowby died in March 1859. Lord Harrowby remained a widower until his death at Sandon Hall on 19 November 1882, aged 84. He was succeeded in the earldom and other titles by his elder son, Dudley.

Parliament of the United Kingdom
| Preceded by Richard Ryder; William Fitzhugh | Member of Parliament for Tiverton; 1819–1831; With: Richard Ryder 1819–1830; Granville Ryder 1830–1831 | Succeeded by Spencer Perceval; Granville Ryder |
| Preceded by William Ewart; Evelyn Denison | Member of Parliament for Liverpool; 1831–1847; With: William Ewart 1831–1837; Cresswell Cresswell 1837–1842; Sir Howard Douglas, Bt 1842–1847 | Succeeded by Edward Cardwell; Sir Thomas Birch, Bt |
Political offices
| Preceded by John Stuart-Wortley | Secretary to the Board of Control; 1830–1831 | Succeeded by Thomas Hyde Villiers |
| Preceded by The Earl Granville | Chancellor of the Duchy of Lancaster; 1855 | Succeeded by Matthew Talbot Baines |
| Preceded by The Duke of Argyll | Lord Privy Seal; 1855–1858 | Succeeded by The Marquess of Clanricarde |
Peerage of the United Kingdom
| Preceded by Dudley Ryder | Earl of Harrowby; 1847–1882 | Succeeded by Dudley Ryder |
