= 1873 Liverpool by-election =

UK Parliamentary by-election

The 1873 Liverpool by-election was held on 7 February 1873 after the death of the incumbent Conservative MP, Samuel Robert Graves. It was retained by the Conservative candidate John Torr.

Liverpool by-election, 1873
Party	Candidate	Votes	%	±%
Conservative	John Torr	18,702	52.7	+0.6
Liberal	William Sproston Caine	16,790	47.3	−0.6
Majority		1,912	5.4	+4.0
Turnout		35,492	67.1	−12.8
Registered electors		52,912		
Conservative hold		Swing	+0.6	
