= John Ramsay, 13th Earl of Dalhousie =

Scottish naval commander, courtier and Liberal politician (1847–1887)

The Right Honourable The Earl of Dalhousie KT PC
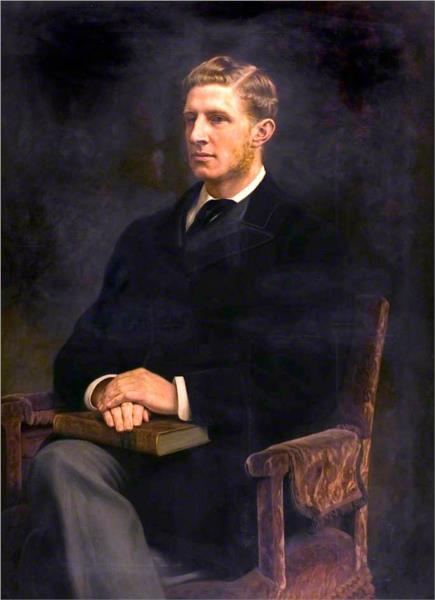

Secretary for Scotland
- In office 5 April 1886 – 20 July 1886
- Monarch: Victoria
- Prime Minister: William Ewart Gladstone
- Preceded by: George Trevelyan
- Succeeded by: Arthur Balfour

Member of Parliament for Liverpool
- In office 1880–1880 Serving with Viscount Sandon; Edward Whitley
- Preceded by: William Rathbone; Viscount Sandon; Edward Whitley
- Succeeded by: Lord Claud Hamilton; Viscount Sandon; Edward Whitley

Personal details
- Born: John William Maule Ramsay; 29 January 1847 Fraserburgh, Aberdeenshire, Scotland
- Died: 25 November 1887 (aged 40) Le Havre, France
- Party: Liberal
- Spouse: Lady Ida Louisa Bennet (m. 1877; died 1887)
- Children: 5 sons, including Arthur, Patrick, and Sir Alexander
- Parent(s): George Ramsay, 12th Earl of Dalhousie; Sarah Frances Robertson
- Relatives: Charles Maule Ramsay (brother)
- Education: Charterhouse School
- Alma mater: Balliol College, Oxford

John William Maule Ramsay, 13th Earl of Dalhousie, KT, PC (29 January 1847 – 25 November 1887), styled Lord Ramsay between 1874 and 1880, was a Scottish naval commander, courtier and Liberal politician. He served as Secretary for Scotland in William Ewart Gladstone's short-lived 1886 administration.

== Early life ==
Dalhousie was born at Aberdour House at Fraserburgh, Aberdeenshire on 29 January 1847. He was the eldest son of Admiral George Ramsay, 12th Earl of Dalhousie, and Sarah Frances, daughter of William Robertson of Logan House. The Hon. Charles Maule Ramsay, MP for Forfarshire, was his younger brother. He gained the courtesy title of Lord Ramsay in 1874 when his father succeeded in the earldom of Dalhousie on the death of his first cousin, Fox Maule-Ramsay, 11th Earl of Dalhousie.

His paternal grandfather was The Hon. John Ramsay (the fourth son of George Ramsay, 8th Earl of Dalhousie).

After attending Charterhouse School, he matriculated at Balliol College, Oxford in 1875.

== Career ==
Dalhousie followed his father into the Royal Navy, where he served from 1861 to 1879, achieving the rank of Commander. He was Equerry to the Duke of Edinburgh between 1874 and 1876 and an Extra Equerry between 1876 and 1880.

=== Political career ===
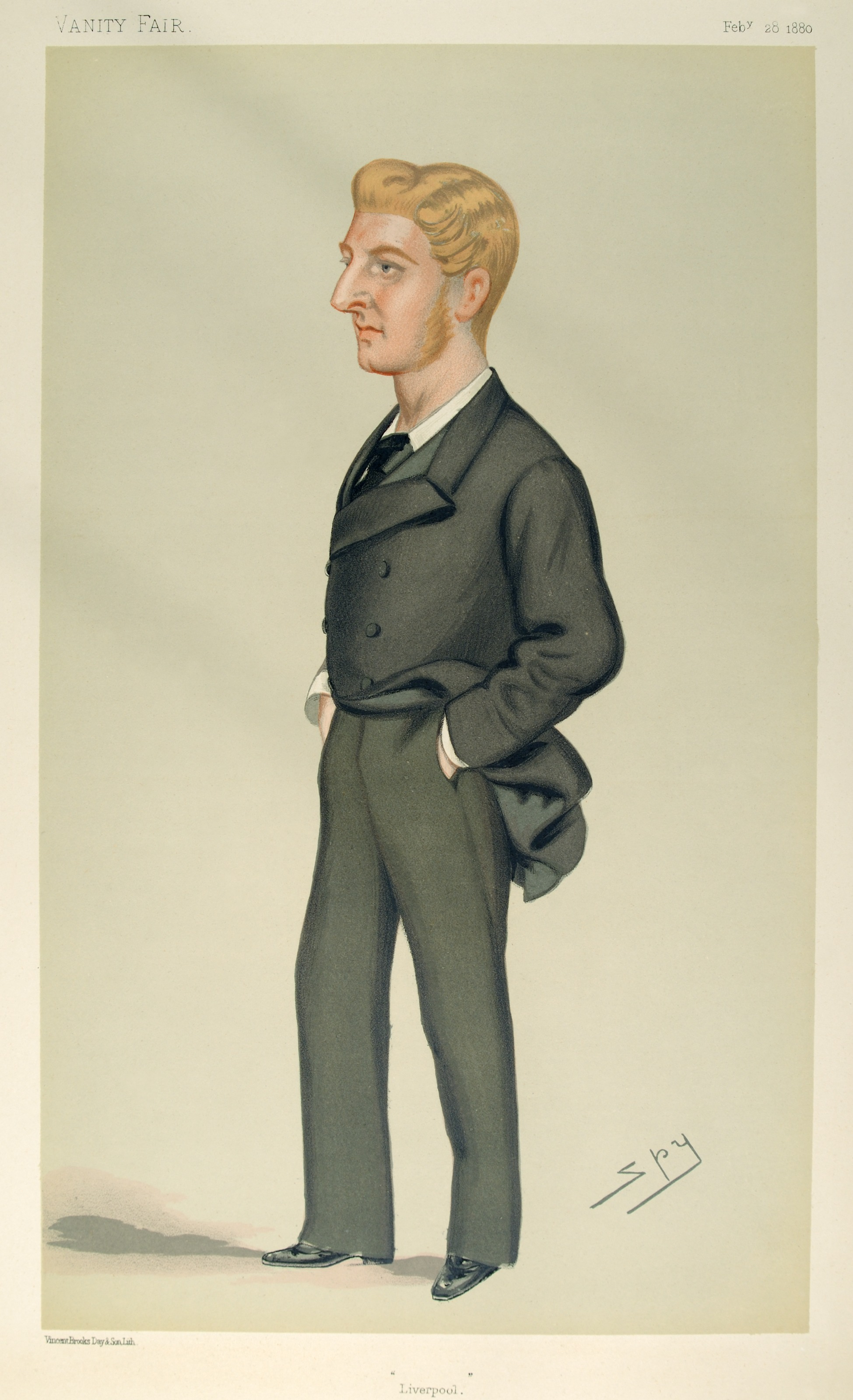
"Liverpool". Caricature by Spy published in Vanity Fair in 1880.

Dalhousie was elected Liberal Member of Parliament for Liverpool in March 1880, but was forced to resign in July 1880 after succeeding his father in the earldom. After taking his seat in the House of Lords he was appointed a Lord-in-waiting in September 1880 by William Ewart Gladstone, a position he held until the government fell in 1885.

In April 1886 he succeeded George Trevelyan (who had resigned over Irish Home Rule) as Secretary for Scotland in Gladstone's short-lived 1886 administration, although in contrast to Trevelyan he was not a member of the cabinet. He was sworn of the Privy Council at the same time. He retained this post until the government fell in July 1886. He was made a Knight of the Thistle in 1881.

== Personal life ==
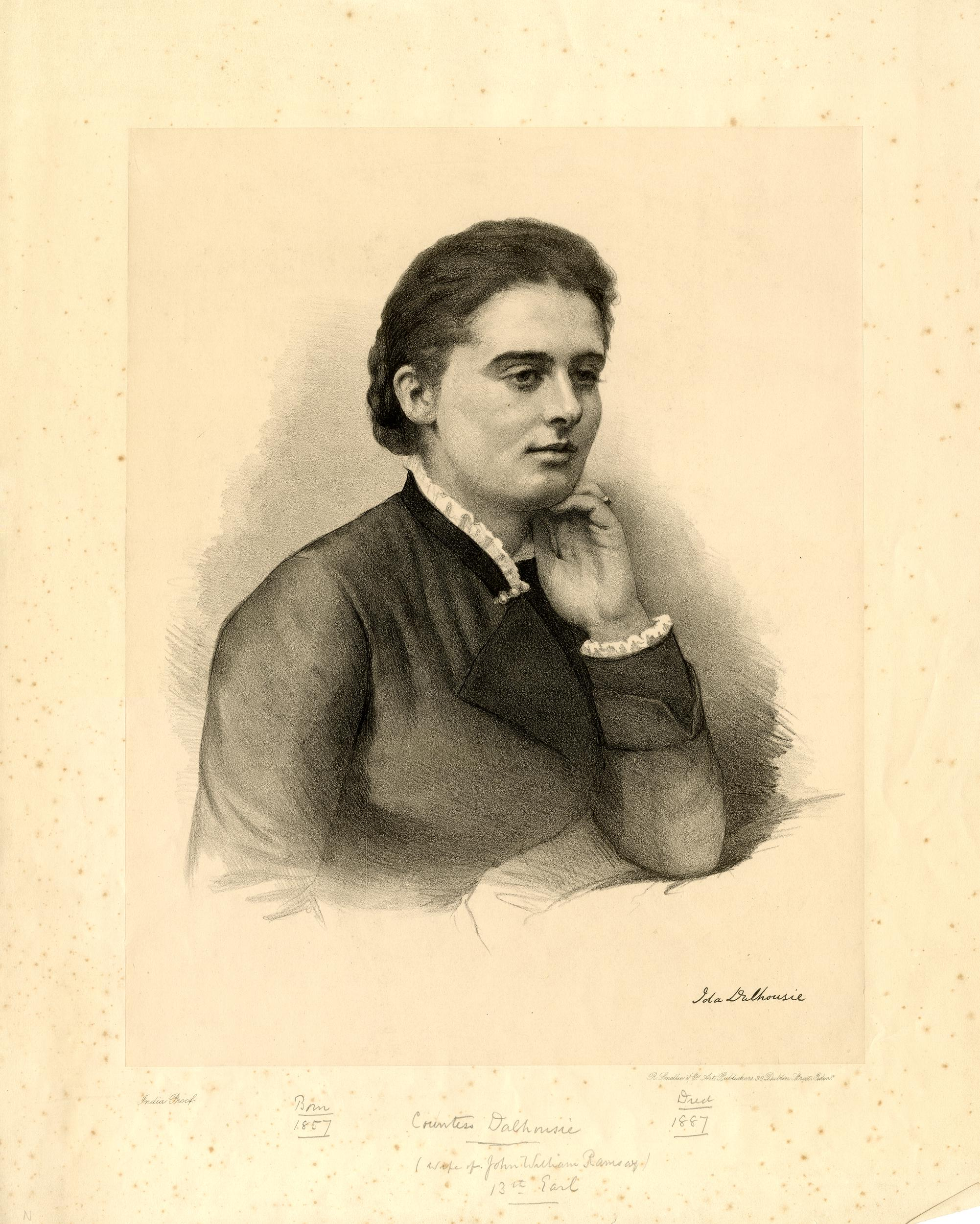
Ida, Countess of Dalhousie, John's wife.

On 6 December 1877, Lord Dalhousie was married to Lady Ida Louisa Bennet. She was a daughter of Charles Bennet, 6th Earl of Tankerville and Olivia Bennet, Countess of Tankerville (eldest daughter of George Montagu, 6th Duke of Manchester). She appeared in 'The World's Beauties' trading card series by cigarette producers Allen & Ginter. Together, Lord and Lady Dalhousie had five sons:

- Arthur George Maule Ramsay, 14th Earl of Dalhousie (1878–1928), who married Lady Mary Heathcote-Drummond, a daughter of Gilbert Heathcote-Drummond-Willoughby, 1st Earl of Ancaster, on 14 July 1903.
- The Hon. Sir Patrick Ramsay (1879–1962), who married Dorothy Surtees on 15 October 1917.
- Adm. The Hon. Sir Alexander Robert Maule Ramsay (1881–1972), who married Princess Patricia of Connaught, a granddaughter of Queen Victoria, on 27 February 1919.
- The Hon. Charles Fox Maule Ramsay (1885–1926), who married Aline Rose Arbuthnot-Leslie, eldest of George Arbuthnot-Leslie of Warthill, in 1919. After his death, she married Maj. Hon. Arthur Michael Cosmo Bertie (a son of Montagu Bertie, 7th Earl of Abingdon).
- Lt. Hon. Ronald Edward Maule Ramsay (1885–1909), who died unmarried.

After returning from a trip to the United States in November 1887, the couple were forced to break off their journey in Le Havre after Lady Dalhousie was taken ill. Despite medical attention she died of peritonitis on 24 November, aged 30. After retiring to bed the same night, Lord Dalhousie never awoke, having apparently suffered from an apoplectic fit during the night, thus surviving his wife by less than 24 hours, dying at age 40.

He owned 138,000 acres in Scotland.

== Sources ==
- Torrance, David, The Scottish Secretaries (Birlinn 2006)

Parliament of the United Kingdom
Preceded by William Rathbone; Viscount Sandon; Edward Whitley	Member of Parliament for Liverpool; 1880–1880; With: Viscount Sandon; Edward Whitley	Succeeded by Lord Claud Hamilton; Viscount Sandon; Edward Whitley
Political offices
Preceded by The Earl of Dunmore; The Viscount Hawarden; The Lord Bagot; The Lord de Ros; The Lord Elphinstone; The Lord Henniker; The Earl of Onslow	Lord-in-waiting; 1880–1885; With: The Lord Methuen; The Lord Ribblesdale; The Lord Sudeley; The Lord Wrottesley; The Lord Sandhurst; The Lord Thurlow	Succeeded by The Lord de Ros; The Earl of Kintore; The Viscount Hawarden; The Lord Henniker; The Earl of Hopetoun; The Lord Elphinstone; The Lord Boston
Preceded by George Trevelyan	Secretary for Scotland; 1886	Succeeded by Arthur Balfour
Peerage of Scotland
Preceded by George Ramsay	Earl of Dalhousie; 1880–1887	Succeeded by Arthur George Maule Ramsay
