= Isaac Gascoyne =

British Army general (1763–1841)

Lieutenant-General Isaac Gascoyne
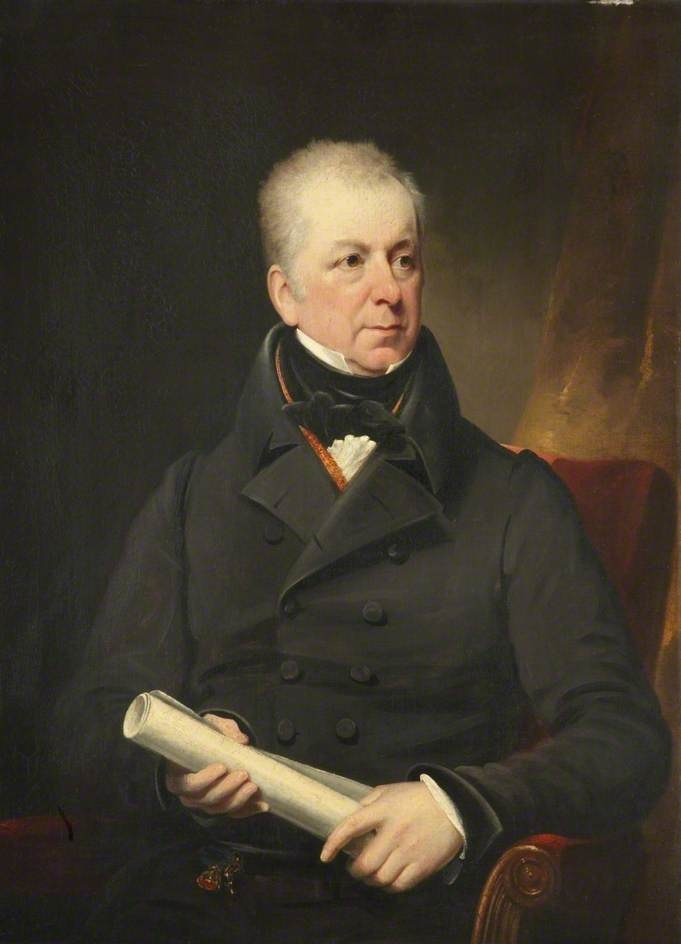
- Portrait by James Lonsdale

Member of Parliament for Liverpool
- In office 1801–1831

Member of Parliament for Liverpool
- In office 1796–1800

Personal details
- Born: 1763
- Died: 26 August 1841 (aged 78) Audley Street, London
- Party: Tory/Ultra-Tory
- Education: Felsted School
- Profession: Soldier, politician

Military service
- Allegiance: United Kingdom
- Branch/service: British Army
- Years of service: 1779–1810s
- Rank: Lieutenant-General
- Battles/wars: French Revolutionary Wars; Battle of Lincelles; Irish Rebellion of 1798

Isaac Gascoyne (21 August 1763 – 26 August 1841) was a British Army officer and Tory politician. He was born at Barking, Essex on 21 August 1763, the third son of Bamber Gascoyne (senior) and Mary Green and was educated at Felsted School.

== Military career ==
On 8 February 1779, Gascoyne was commissioned as a British Army Officer, joining the 20th Regiment of Foot with the rank of Ensign. In July of the following year, still as an Ensign, he transferred to the Coldstream Guards. Gradually rising in rank, he became a Lieutenant on 18 August 1784 and Captain on 5 December 1792, and fought at the Battle of Lincelles in 1793, where he was wounded, but continued to hold various posts into the 1810s, becoming Lieutenant Colonel of the 16th Regiment of Foot on 7 June 1799, Major-General on 29 April 1802, Colonel of the 7th West India Regiment on 10 October 1805, Lieutenant-General on 25 April 1808, and was Colonel of the 54th (West Norfolk) Regiment of Foot from 1 June 1816.

In August 1819 he was promoted to General in charge of the 54th Foot regiment.

== Political career ==
In 1796, Gascoyne was elected as a Member of Parliament for Liverpool, succeeding his elder brother, Bamber Gascoyne. While there, he used his position to strongly oppose the abolition of the Slave Trade and the Reform Act 1832. He also opposed both Catholic Emancipation and the abolition of bull-baiting.

In 1811, Gascoyne received a number of petitions from Liverpool resident John Bellingham, calling for him to take up his claim for compensation from the British government for a period of imprisonment he had suffered in Russia. In May 1812, Bellingham entered the lobby of the House of Commons and shot Prime Minister Spencer Perceval dead. Gascoyne was able to recognise Bellingham, providing leads in the immediate aftermath.

In 1831, Gascoyne moved a motion opposing a reduction of the seats allocated to England. The Government opposed this, holding that it was necessary to address the over-representation of England. When Gascoyne's motion was carried, the Government called the 1831 general election, in an attempt to gain a clear majority for reform.

Gascoyne lost his seat on 4 May after the 1831 election, and died on 26 August 1841 at 71 South Audley Street, London, from an inflammation in his bowels. He was buried in Kensal Green Cemetery, London.

== Personal life and family ==
He has an extensive biographical entry in the Dictionary of National Biography.

Isaac Gascoyne was the father of General Ernest Frederick Gascoyne, of Raby Hall, Liverpool (1796–1867), who was the great-great-great-grandfather of television presenter Bamber Gascoigne.

His daughter Charlotte Gascoyne married on 13 October 1821 Rear Admiral Hon. George Pryse Campbell (1793 – 12 January 1858), son of John Campbell of Cawdor, 1st Baron Cawdor of Castlemartin, and Lady Isabella Caroline Howard.

== Notes and references ==
Parliament of Great Britain
Preceded by Bamber Gascoyne; Banastre Tarleton	Member of Parliament for Liverpool; 1796–1800; With: Banastre Tarleton	Parliament of Great Britain abolished
Parliament of the United Kingdom
Preceded by self in Parliament of Great Britain	Member of Parliament for Liverpool; 1801–1831; With: Banastre Tarleton to 1806; William Roscoe 1806–1807; Banastre Tarleton 1807–1812; George Canning 1812–1823; William Huskisson 1823–1830; William Ewart from 1830	Succeeded by Evelyn Denison; William Ewart
Military offices
Preceded by James Forbes, 17th Lord Forbes	Colonel of the 54th (West Norfolk) Regiment of Foot; 1809–1816	Succeeded by Henry Sheehy Keating
