= Hugh Calverley (MP for Liverpool) =

Member of the Parliament of England (c. 1578–1606)

Hugh Calveley (c. 1578 – 20 September 1606), of Lea, Cheshire, was an English politician who represented Liverpool as a Member of Parliament in 1601 during the latter years of the reign of Elizabeth I. The surname is often misspelt as Calverley which is a Yorkshire-based surname, distinct and not in any way connected to Calveley's Cheshire family.

== Family and education ==
Canting arms of Calveley: Argent, a fess gules between three calves passant sable As a second son, Hugh would have differenced these arms in some manner.

He was born circa 1578, the second son of Hugh Calveley of Lea and his wife Mary, daughter of Sir Ralph Leycester of Toft. He matriculated at The King's Hall and College of Brasenose, Oxford in 1594. The college was associated with Lancashire and Cheshire, the county origins of its two founders, and contained many Catholic sympathizers during an era of Protestant ascendancy. He became a member of The Honourable Society of the Inner Temple in 1597.

Calveley came of a good family, his father being sheriff of Cheshire in 1586, and both his grandfather and his father's elder brother sitting for the county in Parliament. A younger son who died in his twenties, almost nothing is known of him, including how he came to be returned to Parliament for Liverpool. He died at Beeston, Cheshire on 20 September 1606 and was buried near many of his ancestors in Saint Boniface's Church in Higher Bunbury, Cheshire. He was unmarried.

== Sources ==
- Al. Ox. i. 231;
- Ormerod, Cheshire, ii. 709;
- Lancs. and Cheshire Funeral Certs. (Lancs. and Cheshire Rec. Soc. vi), 59.
