= William Ewart (British politician) =

British politician (1798–1869)

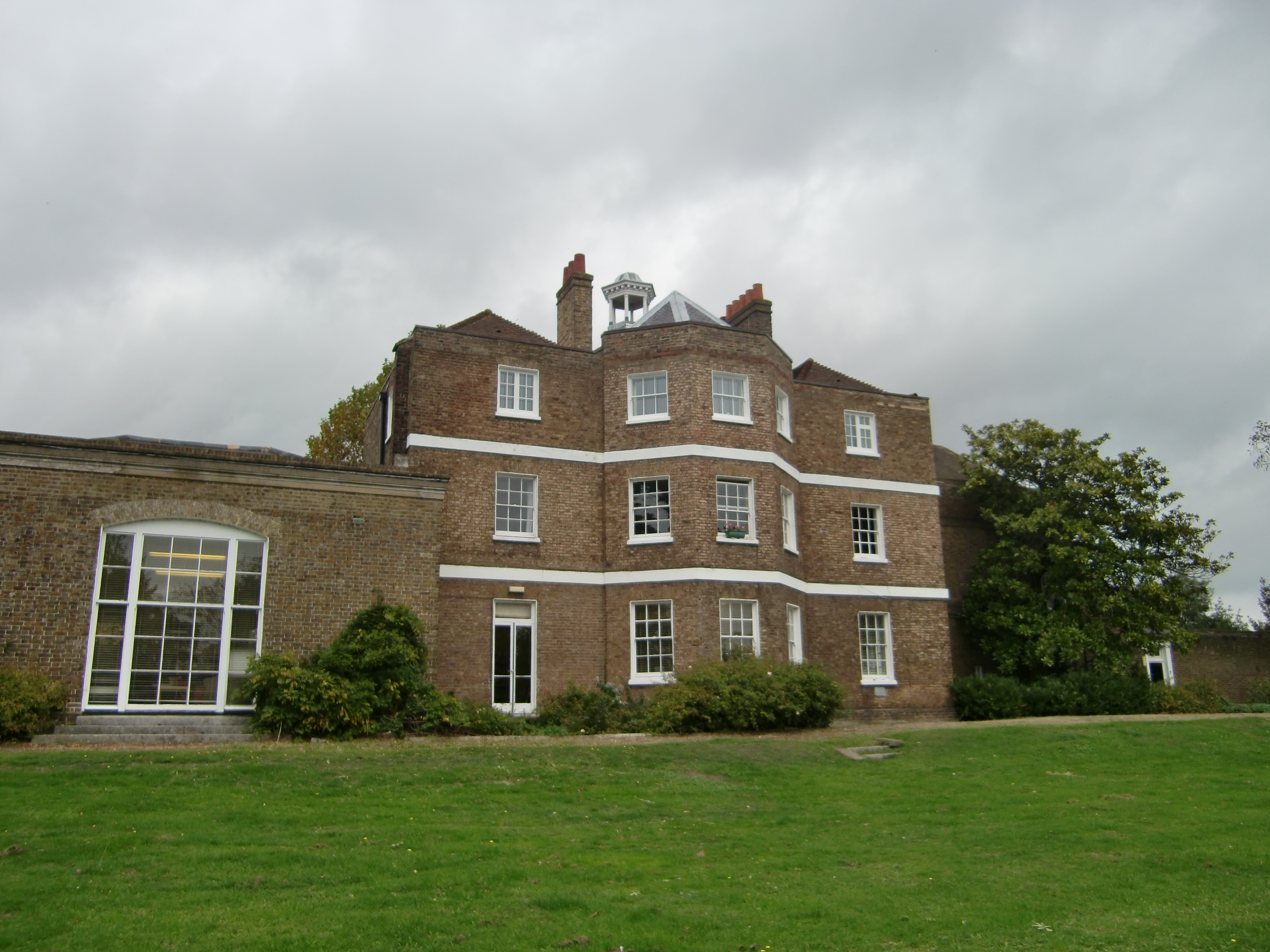
Ewart's Hampton home is now Hampton library (the extension on the left is modern)

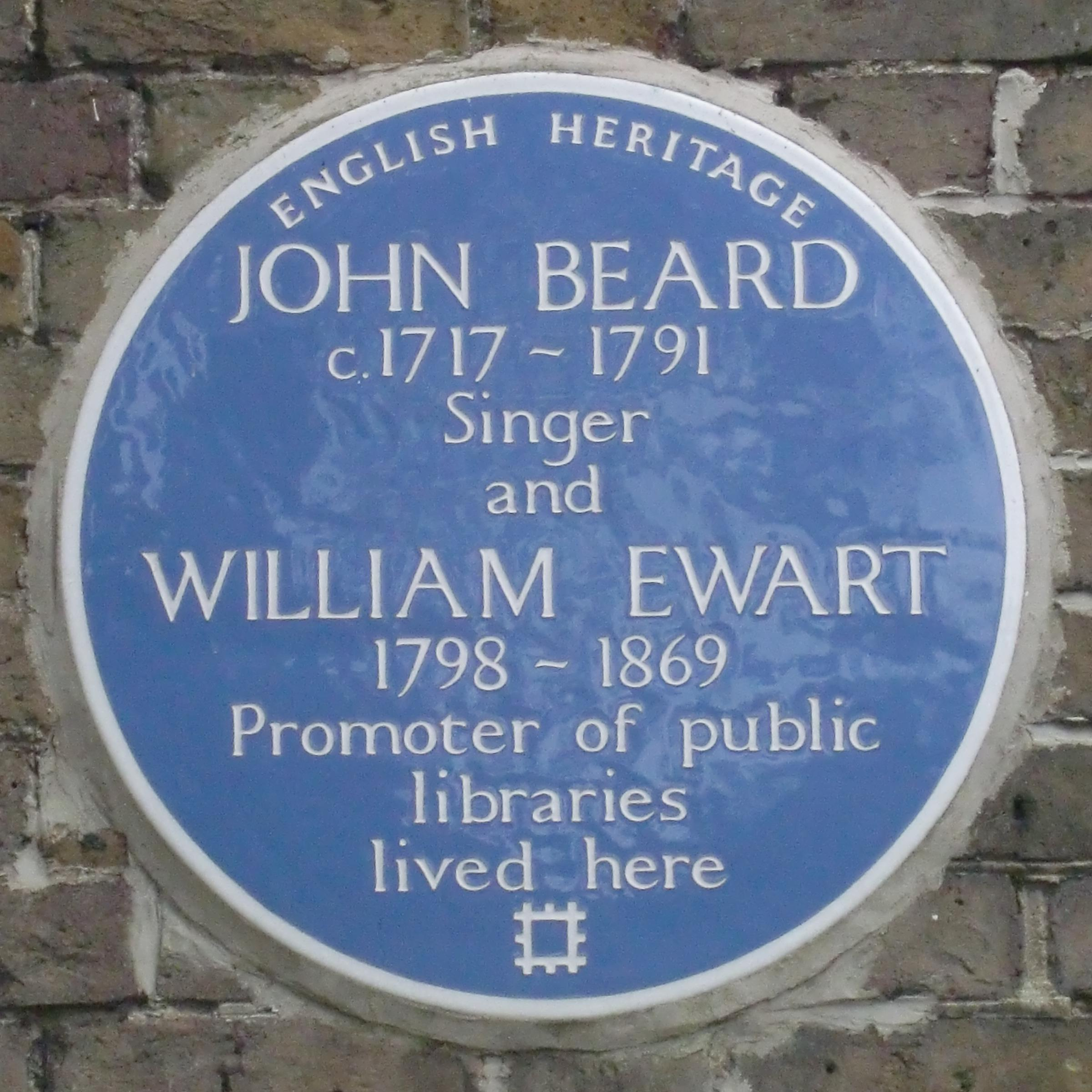
Blue Plaque on Hampton Library to William Ewart, Hampton, London

William Ewart (1 May 1798 – 23 January 1869) was a British politician. In 1863, Ewart conceived the idea of a blue plaque to commemorate a link between a location and a famous person or event, serving as a historical marker. It is the oldest such scheme in the world.

== Life ==
Ewart was born in Liverpool, England, on 1 May 1798. He was educated at Eton and Christ Church, Oxford, gaining the Newdigate Prize for English verse. He was called to the bar at the Middle Temple in 1827, and the next year entered Parliament for the borough of Bletchingley in Surrey, serving until 1830. He subsequently sat for Liverpool from 1830 to 1837, for Wigan from 1839 to 1841, and for Dumfries Burghs from 1841 until his retirement from public life in 1868. He died at his home, Broadleas House, near Devizes, Wiltshire, on 23 January 1869.

Ewart, who was an advanced liberal in politics, was responsible during his long political career for many useful measures. In 1834 he successfully carried a bill to abolish hanging in chains, and in 1837 he was successful in getting an act passed to abolish capital punishment for cattle-stealing and other similar offences. In 1850 he carried a bill for establishing free libraries supported out of public rates, and he was instrumental in getting the Metric Weights and Measures Act 1864 passed to legalise the use of the metric system.

He remained a strong advocate for the abolition of capital punishment, and on his motion in 1864, a Royal Commission was appointed to consider the subject on which he sat. Other reforms which he advocated and which were carried out included an annual statement on education, and the examination of candidates for the civil service and army.

He was a close friend of the Reverend William Gaskell and his wife, the writer Elizabeth Gaskell, and the couple often stayed at Broadleas House. Ewart's daughter, Mary Anne Ewart, was Elizabeth Gaskell's close confidante.

== See also ==
- List of statues and sculptures in Liverpool

== Gallery ==
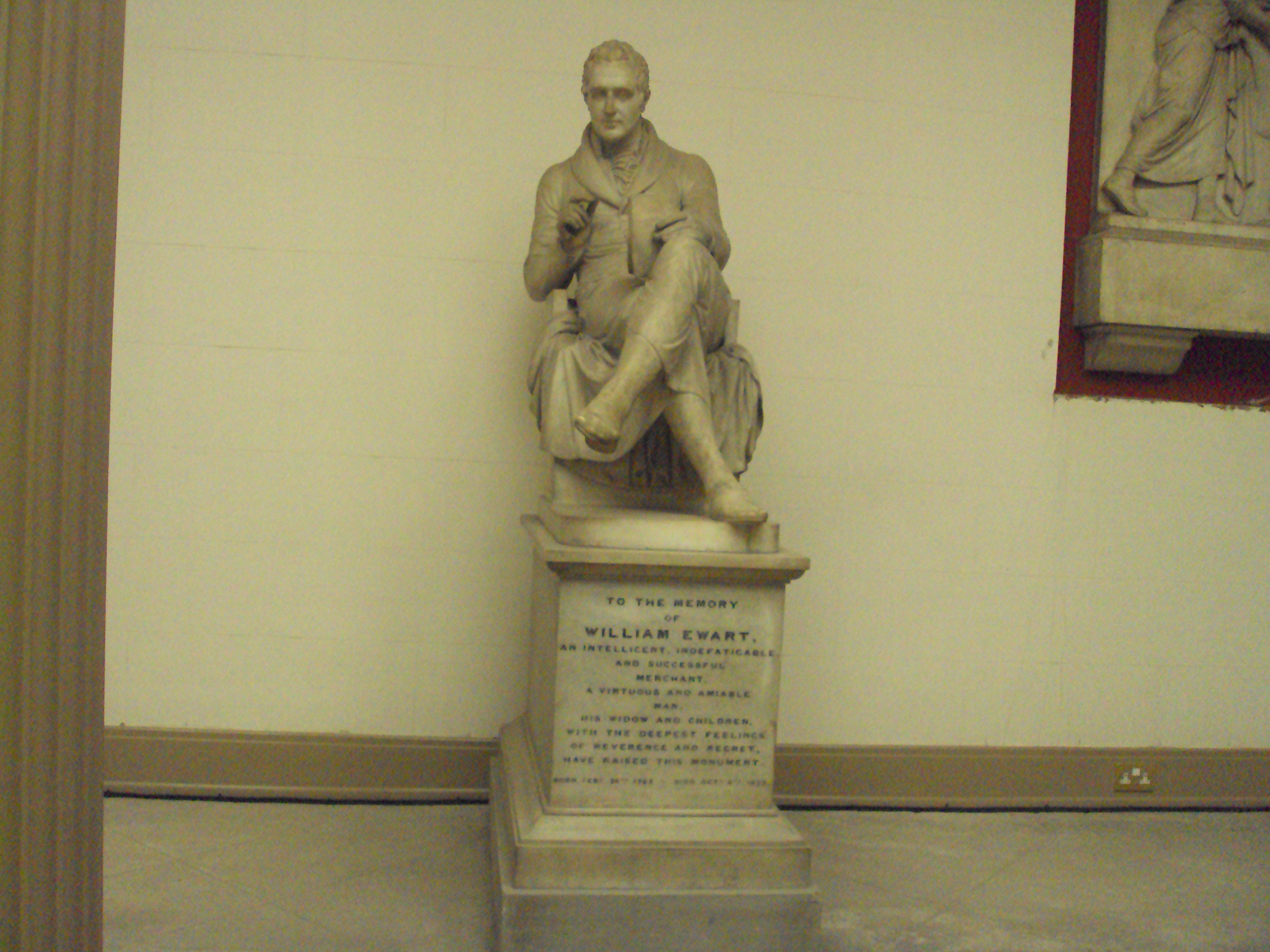
Statue of Ewart at The Oratory, Liverpool, sculpted by Joseph Gott in 1832

== Notes ==
- Leigh Rayment's Historical List of MPs

Parliament of the United Kingdom
Preceded by Hon. William Lamb; Charles Tennyson	Member of Parliament for Bletchingley; 1828–1830; With: Charles Tennyson	Succeeded by Robert William Mills; Charles Tennyson
Preceded by William Huskisson; Isaac Gascoyne	Member of Parliament for Liverpool; 1830–1837; With: Isaac Gascoyne to May 1831; Evelyn Denison May 1831 – October 1831; Viscount Sandon	Succeeded by Cresswell Cresswell; Viscount Sandon
Preceded by Richard Potter; Charles Strickland Standish	Member of Parliament for Wigan; 1839–1841; With: Charles Strickland Standish	Succeeded by Peter Greenall; Thomas Bright Crosse
Preceded by Matthew Sharpe	Member of Parliament for Dumfries Burghs; 1841–1868	Succeeded by Robert Jardine
