= Sir Thomas Birch, 2nd Baronet =

Sir Thomas Bernard Birch, 2nd Baronet DL (18 March 1791 – 3 March 1880) was a British baronet and Whig politician.

He was the only son of Sir Joseph Birch, 1st Baronet and his wife Elizabeth Mary, third daughter of Benjamin Heywood. Birch was educated at Rugby School and went then to Jesus College, Cambridge, where he graduated with a Bachelor of Arts in 1813 and a Master of Arts three years later. In 1817, he was called to the bar by Lincoln's Inn and in 1833, he succeeded his father as baronet.

From 1827 Birch was private secretary to William Lamb (later Lord Melbourne) in his capacity as Chief Secretary for Ireland. He was appointed High Sheriff of Lancashire in 1841 and served as a Deputy Lieutenant for that county. In 1847, he entered the British House of Commons, sitting for Liverpool until 1852.

Birch was unmarried and childless. With his death the baronetcy became extinct.

Parliament of the United Kingdom
Preceded by Sir Howard Douglas, 3rd Bt; Viscount Sandon	Member of Parliament for Liverpool; 1847 – 1852; With: Edward Cardwell	Succeeded by Charles Turner; William Forbes Mackenzie
Baronetage of the United Kingdom
Preceded by Joseph Birch	Baronet (of Hasles); 1833 – 1880	Extinct
