= Ramsay (surname) =

Ramsay (/ˈræmˌziː/) is a Scottish surname. Notable people with the surname include:

- Alan Ramsay (1895–1973), Australian army officer
- Alana Ramsay (born 1994), Canadian alpine skier
- Alex Ramsay (1899–1957), English footballer
- Alexander Ramsay (disambiguation)
- Alison Ramsay, Scottish cricketer
- Alison Ramsay (born 1959), Scottish hockey international
- Allan Ramsay (disambiguation)
- Andrew Ramsay (disambiguation)
- Archibald Maule Ramsay (1894–1955), British Army officer and politician
- Bertram Ramsay (1883–1945), British admiral
- Bill Ramsay (William G. Ramsay, 1929–2024), American jazz saxophonist and band leader
- Bill Ramsay (athlete) (1928–1988), Australian middle-distance runner
- Bill Ramsay (politician) (born 1962), politician in Newfoundland, Canada
- Bob Ramsay (footballer) (1864–?), English footballer
- Chris Ramsay, American magician and YouTuber
- Connie Ramsay (born 1988), Scottish judoka
- Dave Ramsay (born 1970), Canadian politician in the Northwest Territories
- David Ramsay (disambiguation)
- Derek Ramsay (born 1976), British-Filipino model, TV host and actor
- Diana Ramsay (1926–2017), co-founder of the James and Diana Ramsay Foundation in South Australia
- Ebba Ramsay (1828–1922), Swedish social worker, writer, and translator
- Edward Ramsay (1793–1872), Scottish Episcopalian clergyman and dean
- Edward Pierson Ramsay (1842–1916), Australian zoologist
- Eileen Ramsay (1915–2017), British maritime photographer
- Ernest Pringle Ramsay (1870–1952), Australian posts and telegraph director
- Francis Dennis Ramsay (1925–2009), Scottish painter
- Francis Munroe Ramsay (1835–1914), US Navy Officer and Chief of Bureau of Navigation
- Francis Ramsay (cricketer) (1860–1947), English cricketer and pastoralist in Queensland
- Frank William Ramsay, (1875–1954), British Army major general in the First World War
- George Ramsay (disambiguation)
- Gordon Ramsay (disambiguation)
- Heath Ramsay (born 1981), Australian butterfly swimmer
- Helen P. Ramsay (born 1928), Australian bryologist
- Henrik Ramsay (1886–1951), Finnish politician and minister of foreign affairs
- Henry Ramsay (Indian Army officer) (1816–1893), general in the Indian Army, Commissioner of the Kumaon and Garhwal districts
- Henry Ramsay (civil engineer) (1808–1886), American civil engineer
- Ian Ramsay (born 1958), law professor at the University of Melbourne
- Jack Ramsay (1925–2014), American college basketball coach
- James Ramsay (disambiguation)
- Jamie D. Ramsay, South African cinematographer
- Jacques Ramsay, Canadian politician
- Jim Ramsay (1930–2013), Australian politician
- John Ramsay (disambiguation)
- Josh Ramsay (born 1985), Canadian musician
- Mark Ramsay (born 1986), Scottish footballer
- Mark F. Ramsay (born c. 1958), United States Air Force general
- Meta Ramsay (1936–2026), British politician and diplomat, Labour life peer
- Michèle Ramsay, South African geneticist
- Morton Ramsay (1926–1983), Scottish footballer
- Paul Ramsay (1936–2014), Australian businessman and philanthropist
- Paul Ramsay (British philanthropist) (born 1953), philanthropist
- Peter de Ramsay (died 1256), Bishop of Aberdeen
- Peter Ramsay (1939–2019), New Zealand academic
- Richie Ramsay (born 1983), Scottish golf international
- Robert Ramsay (disambiguation)
- Scott Ramsay (footballer) (born 1980), English footballer
- Shyam Ramsay (1952–2019), Bollywood film director
- Silas Alexander Ramsay (1850–1942), mayor of Calgary, Alberta, Canada
- Tilly Ramsay (born 2001), Anglo-Scottish TV presenter, daughter of Gordon Ramsay
- Tulsi Ramsay (1944–2018), Indian film director
- Walter C. Ramsay (1878–1928), American politician and newspaper editor
- Wilhelm Ramsay (1865–1928), Finnish geologist
- William Ramsay (disambiguation)

== See also ==
- Fox Maule-Ramsay, 11th Earl of Dalhousie (1801–1874), British political leader
- Clan Ramsay
- Ramsay (nobility), a Finnish and Swedish noble family
- Ramsey (surname)
