= Ramsey (surname) =

Ramsey (/ˈræmˌziː/) is an English toponymic surname of Old English origin, derived either from Ramsey in Huntingdonshire or Ramsey in Essex. Notable people with the surname include:

- Aaron Ramsey (born 1990), Welsh footballer
- Aaron Ramsey (born 2003), English footballer
- Alexander Ramsey (1815–1903), American politician; second governor of Minnesota
- Alf Ramsey (1920–1999), English football manager; led the England national football team to a World Cup victory
- Alma Ramsey (1907–1993), British sculptor
- Anne Ramsey (1929–1988), American actress
- Ariana Ramsey (born 2000), American rugby player
- Arthur Stanley Ramsey (1867–1924), British mathematician
- Bella Ramsey (born 2003), British actor
- Ben Ramsey (politician) (1903–1985), American politician, former Lieutenant Governor of Texas
- Bill Ramsey, multiple people
- Boniface Ramsey (born 1945), American Roman Catholic priest
- Charles H. Ramsey (born 1950), American former Washington, D.C. chief of police and Philadelphia police commissioner
- Chris Ramsey, British comedian
- Claude Ramsey (1943–2018), American farmer and politician
- David Ramsey (disambiguation), multiple people including Dave Ramsey
- Derrick Ramsey (born 1956), American football administrator and former player
- DeWitt Clinton Ramsey (1888–1961), American naval commander
- Edwin P. Ramsey (1917–2003), US Army officer and guerrilla leader during the Japanese World War II occupation of the Philippines
- Elizabeth Ramsey (1931–2015), Filipino comedian, singer and actress
- Emily Ramsey (footballer) (born 2000), English footballer
- Franchesca Ramsey (born 1983), American activist, comedian, and YouTuber known as Chescaleigh
- Frank Ramsey (basketball) (1931–2018), American basketball player and coach
- Frank P. Ramsey (1903–1930), British mathematician; originator of Ramsey theory
- Geoff Ramsey (born 1975), American voice actor
- Gordon Ramsey (1930–1993), American television, stage and voice actor
- Griffon Ramsey (born 1980), American chainsaw artist
- Gustavus Ramsey (1857–1926), American politician
- Ian Ramsey (1915–1972), English philosopher and Bishop of Durham
- Jacob Ramsey (born 2001), English footballer
- Jahmi'us Ramsey (born 2001), American basketball player
- Jalen Ramsey (born 1994), American football cornerback for the Pittsburgh Steelers
- Jessica Ramsey (born 1991), American shot putter
- John Bennett Ramsey (born 1943), American businessman, author, and father of JonBenét Ramsey
- JonBenét Ramsey (1990–1996), American child beauty pageant contestant murdered in 1996
- Joseph H. Ramsey (1816–1894), American politician
- Justus Cornelius Ramsey (1821–1881), American politician
- Kamari Ramsey (born 2004), American football player
- Lane Ramsey (born 1996), American baseball player
- Laura Ramsey (born 1982), American actress
- Leonard G. G. Ramsey (1913–1990), editor of The Connoisseur magazine
- Leroy Ramsey, Belizean convict
- Logan Ramsey (1921–2000), American actor
- Marion Ramsey (1947–2021), American actresses and singer
- Mason Ramsey (born 2006), American singer
- Mary Ramsey, multiple people
- Mary Ramsey (philanthropist) (died 1601), English philanthropist
- Mary Ramsey (musician), (born 1963), American singer-songwriter
- Matt Ramsey, multiple people
- Michael Ramsey (disambiguation), multiple people
- Norman Foster Ramsey, Jr. (1915–2011), American physicist and Nobel prize laureate
- Patrick Ramsey (born 1979), American professional football player
- Patsy Ramsey (1956–2006), American beauty pageant winner and mother of JonBenét Ramsey
- Paul Ramsey (disambiguation), multiple people
- Peter Ramsey (born 1962), American filmmaker
- Randy Ramsey (born 1995), American football player
- Robert Ramsey (disambiguation), multiple people
- Rolla Ramsey (1872–1955), American physicist, university professor, and radio electronics pioneer
- Sam Ramsey (1873–1956), Scottish-born Wales international rugby union player
- Steve Ramsey (musician), British guitarist
- Toad Ramsey (1864–1906), American baseball player
- Wes Ramsey (born 1977), American actor
- William Ramsey (disambiguation), multiple people

== Fictional characters ==
- Doug Ramsey, a Marvel Comics character also known as Cypher
- Zak Ramsey, a character in the television series Hollyoaks

== See also ==
- Baron de Ramsey, title in the Peerage of the United Kingdom, created in 1887
- Ramsay (surname)
- Rasey
