= Mary Avery =

Mary Avery may refer to:

- Mary Ellen Avery (1927–2011), American pediatrician
- Mary Ann Ogden Avery (1825–1911), art collector and museum benefactor
- Mary Ramsey (philanthropist) (died 1601), also known as Mary Avery, English philanthropist
