= Rumsey (surname) =

Rumsey is a surname. Notable people with the surname include:

- Andrew Rumsey (born 1968), British Anglican priest and bishop-designate
- Benjamin Rumsey (1734–1808), American jurist
- Brad Rumsey (born 1986), American football coach
- Catherine Cool Rumsey, American politician
- Charles Cary Rumsey (1879–1922), American sculptor
- Deborah J. Rumsey (born 1961), American statistician
- David Rumsey (disambiguation), multiple people
- Digby Rumsey (born 1952), English film director
- Edward Rumsey (1796–1868), American politician
- Elida Rumsey, American Civil War nurse
- Elisha Rumsey (c. 1785 – 1827), American pioneer
- Fred Rumsey (born 1935), English cricketer
- Howard Rumsey (1917–2015), American jazz double-bassist
- James Rumsey (1743–1792), American mechanical engineer
- Janet Rumsey (1931–2008), American baseball player
- Julian Sidney Rumsey (1823–1886), American politician
- Mary Harriman Rumsey (1881–1934), American activist
- Norman Rumsey (1922–2007), New Zealand optical designer
- Robert Rumsey (1844–1884), English cricketer
- Shirley Rumsey, English musician
- Tessa Rumsey, American poet
- Vern Rumsey (1973–2020), American bass guitarist
- Victor H. Rumsey (1919–2015), American electrical engineer
- Walter Rumsey (1584–1660), Welsh judge and politician
- William Rumsey (1841–1903), American lawyer, diplomat and judge
