= Mike Ramsay =

Mike Ramsay may refer to:

- Mike Ramsay, candidate of the Liberal Party in the 2003 Ontario, Canada provincial election
- Mike Ramsay, co-creator of TiVo and co-founder of the company, TiVo Inc.

== See also ==
- Mike Ramsey (disambiguation)
