= Bob Ramsey =

Bob Ramsey may refer to:

- Bob Ramsay (footballer) (1864–?), English professional footballer
- Bob Ramsey (footballer, born 1935) (born 1935), English professional footballer
- Bob Ramsey (soccer) (born 1957), retired American soccer player
- Bob Ramsey (politician) (born 1947), member of the Tennessee House of Representatives

== See also ==
- Robert Ramsey (disambiguation)
