= Journal of Daylighting =

- Discipline: Energy, Buildings and Lighting
- Language: English
- Edited by: Dr Irfan Ullah

Publication details
- History: 2014-present
- Publisher: SolarLits Limited (Hong Kong)
- Frequency: Bi-annual
- Open access: Yes
- License: CC BY

Standard abbreviations
- ISO 4: J. Daylight.

Indexing
- ISSN: 2383-8701
- OCLC no.: 914216388

Links
- Journal homepage; Online archive

Journal of Daylighting is a biannual, online peer-reviewed scientific journal devoted to investigations of daylighting in buildings. It is published by Solarlits Limited (Hong Kong).

== Abstracting and indexing ==
The journal is abstracted and indexed in:

- Web of Science
- Emerging Sources Citation Index (ESCI)
- Scopus
- Directory of Open Access Journals
- EBSCO Information Services
- Avery Index to Architectural Periodicals
