= Rumsey =

Rumsey may refer to:

== Places ==
- Rumsey, Alberta
- Rumsey, California
- Rumsey, Kentucky

== Other uses ==
- Rumsey (surname)
