= Andrew Ramsey =

Andrew Ramsey may refer to:

- Andrew Ramsey (footballer), Scottish footballer
- Andrew Ramsey (ice hockey); see 2006–07 NCAA Division I men's ice hockey season
- Andrew Ramsay (geologist) (1814–1891), Scottish geologist (sometimes spelt "Ramsey")

== See also ==
- Andrew Ramsay (disambiguation)
