= Andrew Ramsay =

Andrew Ramsay may refer to:

- Andrew Ramsay (minister) (1574–1659), Scottish minister, Rector of the University of Edinburgh
- Andrew Ramsay, Lord Abbotshall (1619–1688), Scottish judge, Lord Provost of Edinburgh (son of the above)
- Sir Andrew Ramsay, 1st Baronet, Scottish politician
- Andrew Michael Ramsay (1686–1743), Scottish-born writer in France
- Andrew Ramsay (governor), governor of Bombay, 1788
- Andrew Ramsay (geologist) (1814–1891), Scottish geologist
- Andrew Maitland Ramsay (1859–1946), Scottish ophthalmologist
- Andy Ramsay (born 1964), British drummer, programmer and sound engineer
- Several of the Ramsay baronets

== See also ==
- Andrew Ramsay Don-Wauchope (1861–1948), Scottish international rugby union forward
- Andrew Ramsey (disambiguation)
