= Henry Ogden Avery =

American architect

Henry Ogden Avery (January 31, 1852 – April 30, 1890) was an American architect and the namesake of the Avery Architectural and Fine Arts Library at Columbia University. He was the first professor of architecture at Columbia University, appointed in 1881.

He was born in Brooklyn, New York on January 31, 1852, the son of Samuel Putnam Avery and Mary Ann Ogden. He graduated from Cooper Union in 1869. He studied at the Ecole des Beaux-Arts, and practiced in the architecture firm of Richard Morris Hunt until he founded his own firm in 1883.

After he died in 1890, his parents donated his papers to found the Avery Library at Columbia University.
