= David Ramsay =

David Ramsay may refer to:

== Government and politics ==
=== Canada ===
- David Ramsay (Ontario politician) (1948–2020), Canadian politician in Legislative Assembly of Ontario
- Dave Ramsay (born 1970), Canadian politician in the Northwest Territories
- David William Ramsay (1943–2008), Canadian lawyer and judge

=== Other areas ===
- David Ramsay (historian) (1749–1815), American historian and politician from South Carolina
- David Ramsay (communist) (1883–1948), British socialist activist
- Sir David Ramsay, 4th Baronet (after 1673–1710), among Scottish representatives to 1st Parliament of Great Britain MP for Scotland & Kincardineshire
- Dave Ramsay (rugby union) (born 1977), Canadian rugby player

== Other ==
- David Ramsay (watchmaker) (c. 1590–1653), British clockmaker and watchmaker
- David Ramsay (trader) (c. 1740–c. 1810), controversial trader in Upper Canada
- David Ramsay (curler) (born 1957), Scottish curler
- David Prophet Ramsay (1888–1944), Scottish painter

== See also ==
- David Ramsey (disambiguation)
- David Rumsey (disambiguation)
