= Deborah J. Rumsey =

American statistician and statistics educator

Deborah Jean Rumsey-Johnson (born 1961) is an American statistician and statistics educator. She is an associated professor and program specialist in statistics at the Ohio State University.

== Education and career ==
Rumsey earned her Ph.D. at Ohio State in 1993. Her dissertation, Nonresponse in Social Network Analysis, was supervised by Elizabeth Stasny. In 2002 she became founding director of the Consortium for the Advancement of Undergraduate Statistics Education. She directed the Mathematics and Statistics Learning Center at Ohio State from 2000 to 2004, and became a faculty member in the Ohio State Department of Statistics in 2004.

== Contributions ==
Rumsey is the author of five books on statistics in the "For Dummies" book series. She is also the author of highly cited research publications on the statistics of people seeking employment, and on education for statistical literacy.

== Recognition ==
Rumsey was elected as a Fellow of the American Statistical Association in 2006.
