= Mary Ramsey =

Mary Ramsey may refer to:

- Mary Ramsey (philanthropist) (died 1601), English philanthropist
- Mary Ramsey (musician) (born 1963), American singer-songwriter
- Mary Ramsey Wood (died 1908), American pioneer, born Mary Ramsey
- Mary Paton Ramsay (1885–?), Scottish academic, born Mary Ramsey
- Lady Mary Ramsey, born Mary Heathcote-Drummond, wife of Arthur Ramsay, 14th Earl of Dalhousie
