= Alexander Ramsay =

Alexander Ramsay may refer to:

- Sir Alexander Ramsay, 5th Baronet, MP for Kincardineshire, 1713–1715
- Sir Alexander Ramsay, 2nd Baronet, MP for Kincardineshire, 1820–1826
- Sir Alexander Ramsay, 3rd Baronet, Liberal MP for Rochdale, 1857–1859
- Sir Alexander Ramsay of Dalhousie (died 1342), captor of Roxburgh Castle in 1342
- Sir Alexander Ramsay (Royal Navy officer) (1881–1972), British admiral
- Captain Alexander Ramsay of Mar (1919–2000)
- Alexander Ramsay (architect) (c. 1777–1847), Scottish builder and architect
- Alexander Ramsay (Australian politician) (1863–1925), member of the Victorian Legislative Assembly
- Alexander Ramsay (minister) (1638–1702), Scottish minister of St Giles Cathedral
- Alexander Ramsay (West Bromwich MP) (1887–1969), British Conservative Party politician, Member of Parliament, 1931–1935
- Alexander Maurice Ramsay (1914–1978), General Manager of the South Australian Housing Trust
- Alex Ramsay (1899–1957), English footballer

== See also ==
- Alexander Ramsey (1815–1903), American politician
- Alexander Ramsey (footballer) (1867–1942), English footballer
