= Paul Ramsey =

Paul Ramsey may refer to:

- Paul Ramsey (ethicist) (1913–1988), American ethicist
- Paul Ramsey (footballer) (born 1962), Northern Irish footballer
- Paul Ramsey (musician) (born 1966), American drummer
- Paul Ramsey (politician), Canadian politician
- Paul G. Ramsey, American physician and academic administrator
- Paul H. Ramsey, (1905–1982), United States Navy naval aviator
- Paul Ray Ramsey (born 1963), American YouTube personality and public speaker
