= Robert Ramsay =

Robert Ramsay may refer to:

== Australia ==
- Robert Ramsay (Queensland politician) (1818–1910)
- Robert Ramsay (Victorian politician) (1842–1882)

== United Kingdom ==
- Robert Ramsay (principal) (1598–1651), principal of Glasgow University
- Robert Ramsay (Jacobite) (died 1689), Scottish military officer killed at the Siege of Derry
- Bob Ramsay (footballer) (1864–?), English footballer
- Robert Ramsay (cricketer) (1861–1957), cricketer for Cambridge University and Somerset

== United States ==
- Robert Ramsay (baseball) (1973–2016), pitcher for the Seattle Mariners
- Robert L. Ramsay (academic) (1880–1953), American toponymist
- Robert L. Ramsay (politician) (1877–1956), American politician

== See also ==
- Robert George Wardlaw-Ramsay (1852–1921), British Army officer and ornithologist
- Robert Ramsey (disambiguation)
