= Charles Loring Elliott =

American painter (1812–1868)

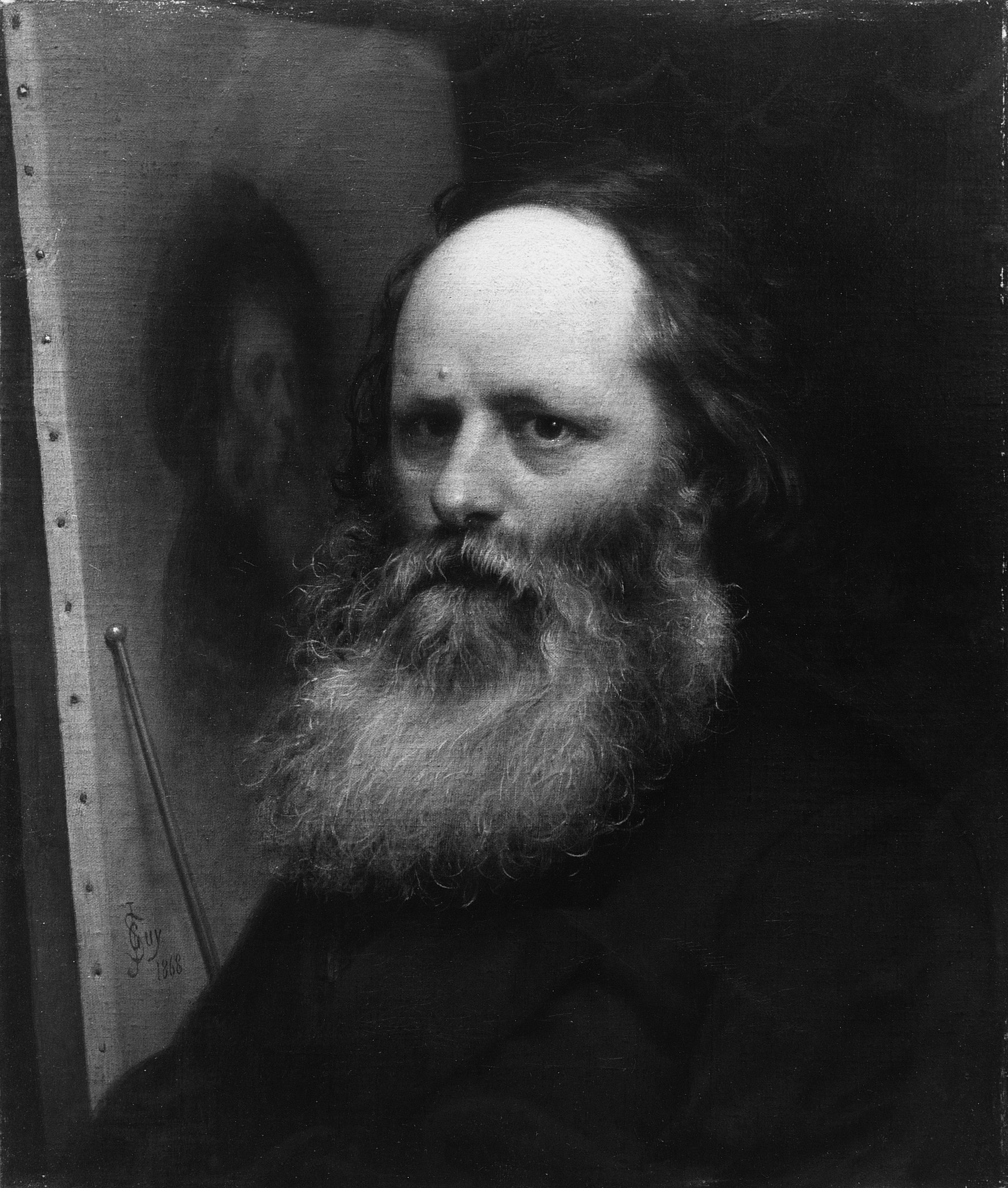
- Charles Loring Elliott in 1868
- Born: 1812; Auburn, New York, U.S.
- Died: 1868 (aged 55–56)
- Occupation: Painter

Charles Loring Elliott (1812 – 1868) was an American painter known for his portraits. He was active in central New York for 10 years as a young man, then in 1845 moved to New York City, to pursue his career. He was elected to the National Academy of Design in 1846.

== Early life and education ==
Elliott was born in Auburn, New York in 1812. His father was a builder and, as a boy, Elliott spent many hours in his workshop. He showed skill in constructing toys, sleds, wagons and small windmills, as well as in drawing. While in the public school, he studied from pictures and life to perfect his drawing. When he was 15, the family moved to Syracuse, then a small frontier hamlet, where his father had a dry goods and grocery store. He assigned Charles to work with him, but the youth was not interested in becoming a merchant.

His father continued to work as a builder and asked the son to do architectural drawings for him, which he did quite well. The younger Elliott also studied the subject at a select school, but he still wanted to be a painter. His father finally approved his move to New York City for further study. He studied with the painters Colonel John Trumbull, who first advised him to be an architect because of his skilled drawings, and John Quidor.

== Career ==
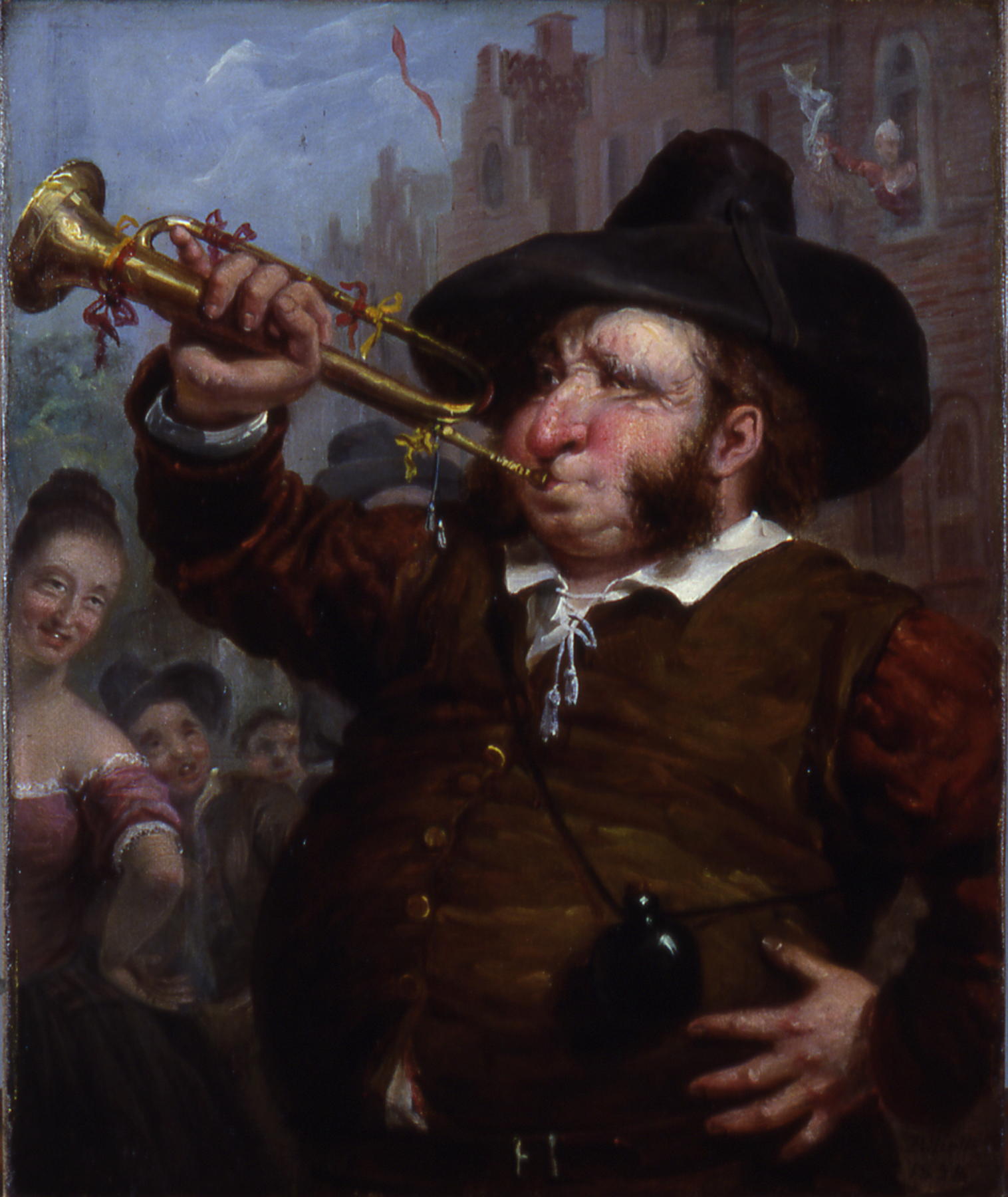
This scene, depicting Anthony Van Corlear, is taken from Washington Irving's A History of New York (1809)

Elliott returned to central New York, where he worked intensively at portrait painting for 10 years. Among his works were portraits of many faculty at Hamilton College. After 10 years' practice, his portraits "were never stiff, or clumsy, or cold; but gradually grace, and ease, and warmth, and high feeling, stole into the forms on his canvas…" Needing the stimulation of the city, he returned to New York in 1845, where Trumbull approved of his progress in painting. The following year he was elected to the National Academy of Design, which was a measure of recognition and helped him attract more clients.

Elliott was considered the best portraitist of his day. Although he never studied abroad, his technique is neither provincial nor uncertain. His method is mature, his drawing firm, his color fresh and clean, and his likenesses excellent, though somewhat lacking in sentiment. He was said to have painted over 700 portraits, mostly heads, as he had little idea of the composition of large canvases. He also painted figure pieces, including Don Quijote and Falstaff, and one landscape, The Head of Skaneateles Lake.

Among his sitters were Fenimore Cooper, Fitz-Greene Halleck, Fletcher Harper, A. B. Durand (The Corcoran Gallery, Washington), and Governor Bouck (City Hall, New York). Additional portraits by Elliott hang in the New York City Hall, and the New York State Library at Albany. Four of his portraits are held by the Metropolitan Museum of Art in New York City.

== Selected portraits ==
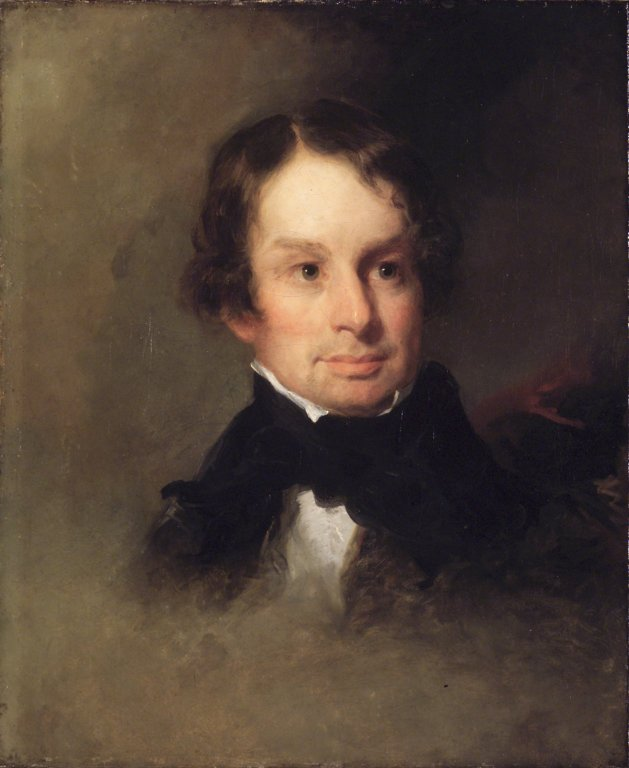
Henry Wadsworth Longfellow, c. 1842

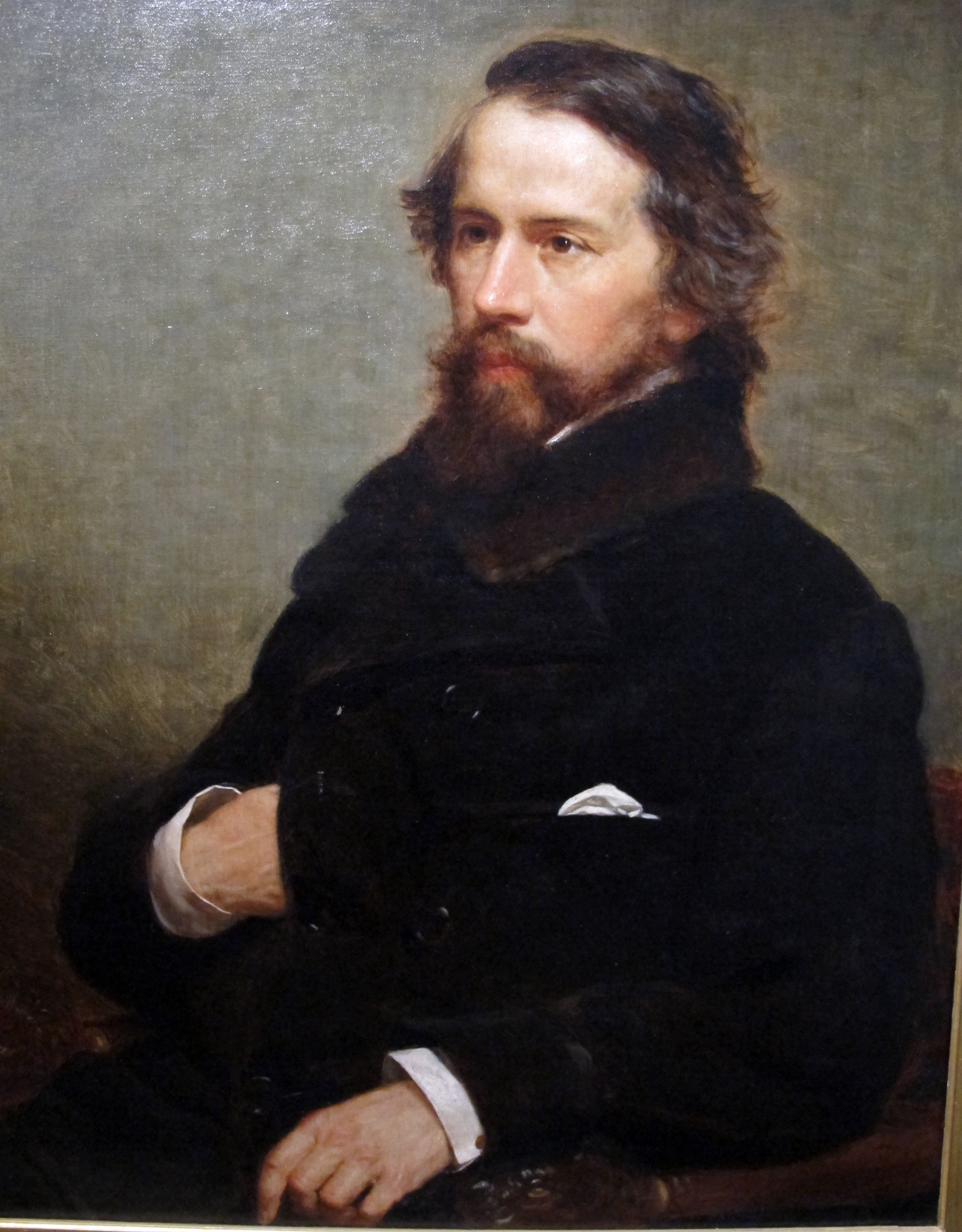
John Charles Frémont, c. 1857

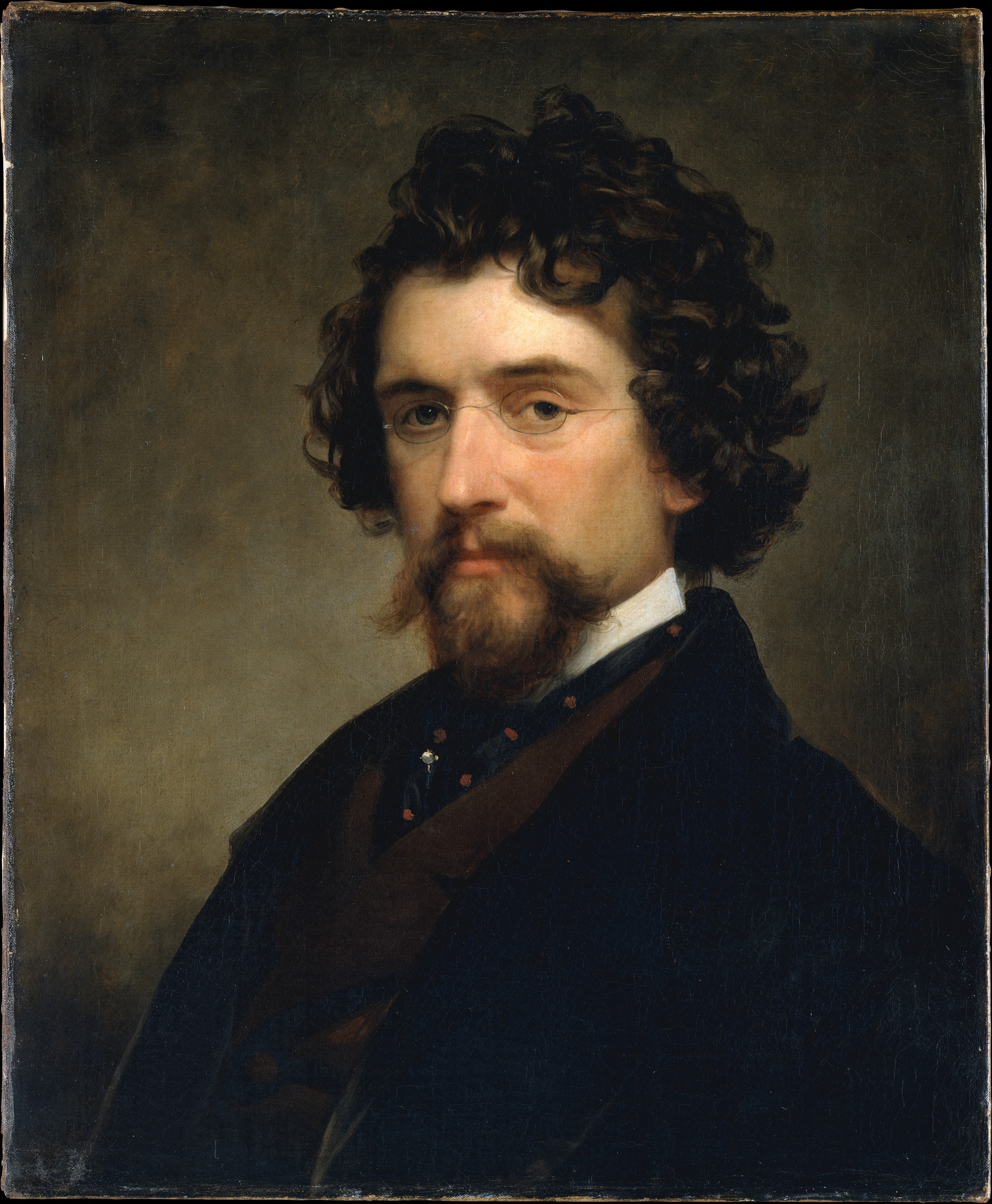
Mathew Brady, c. 1857

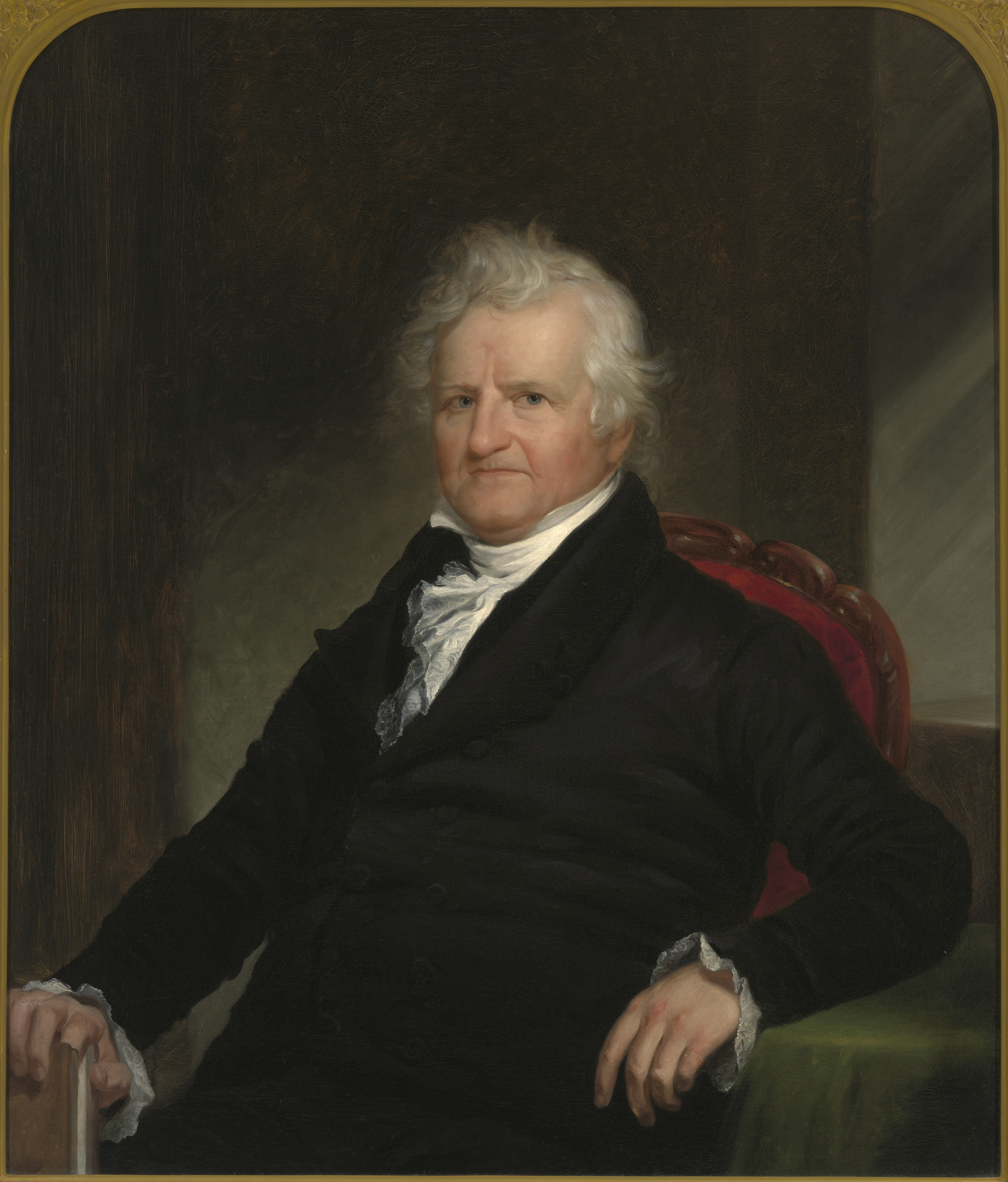
Joseph Bradley Varnum, after Ezra Ames, c. 1858

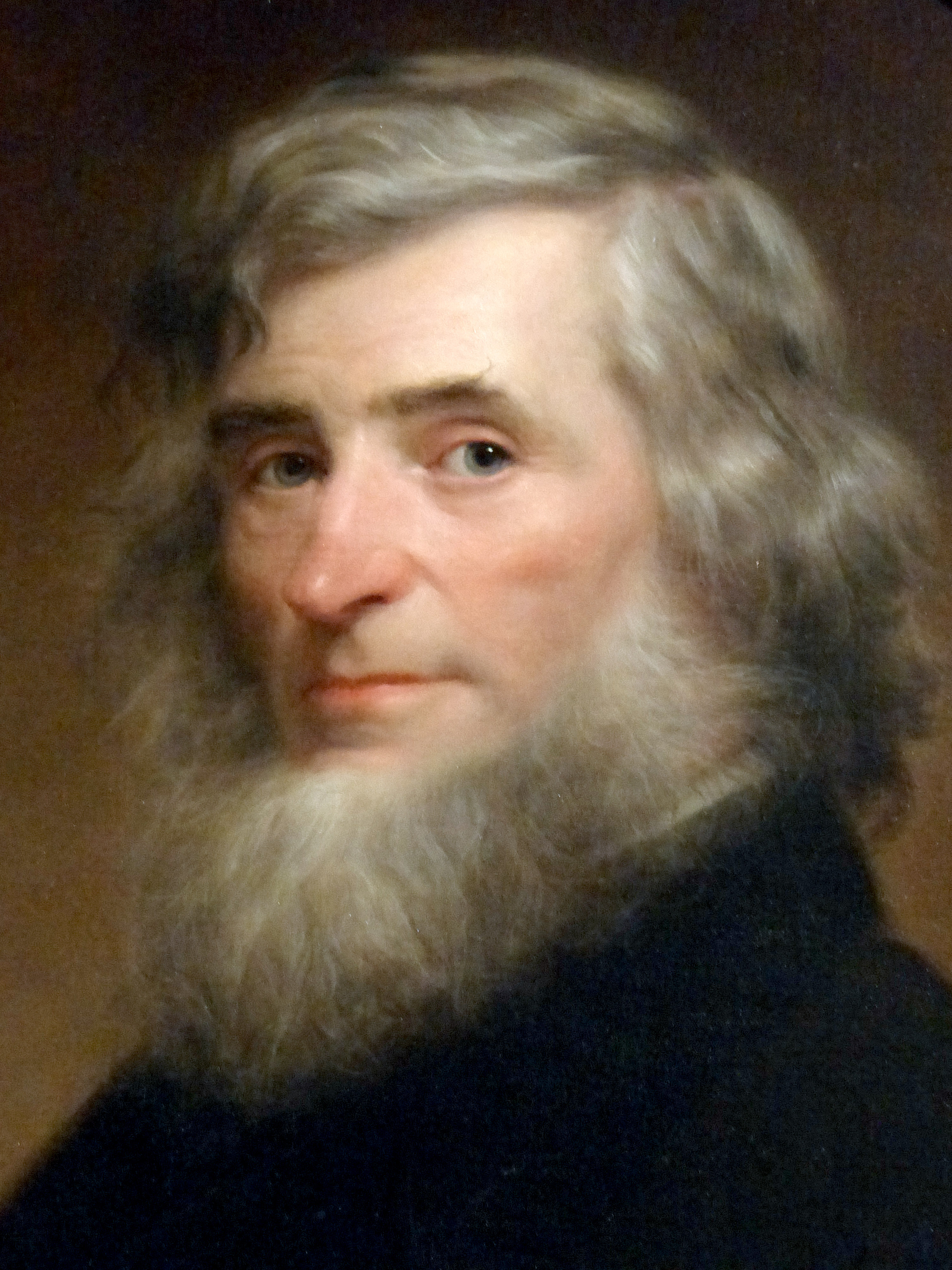
Asher Durand, c. 1860

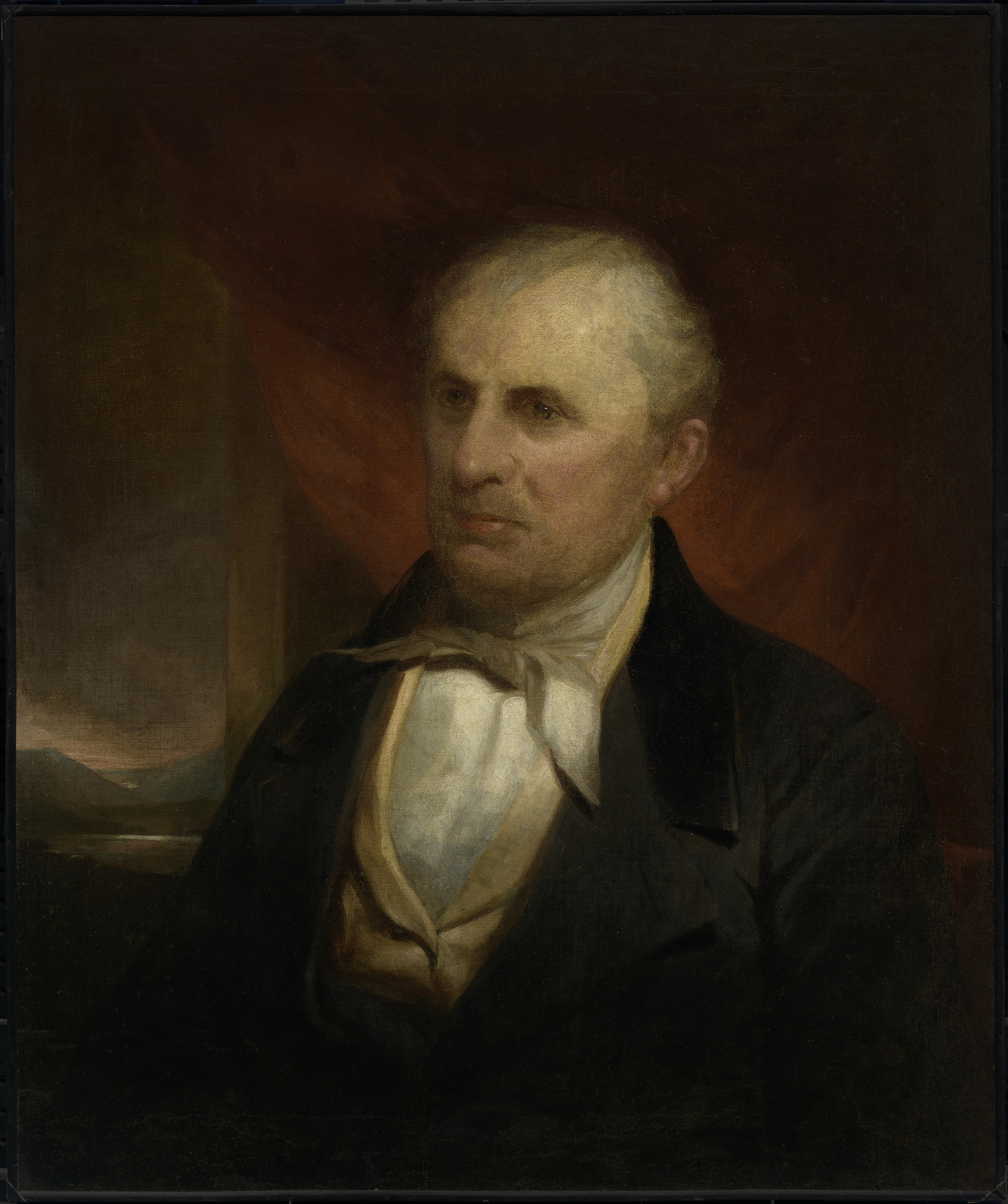
James Fenimore Cooper, c. 1860

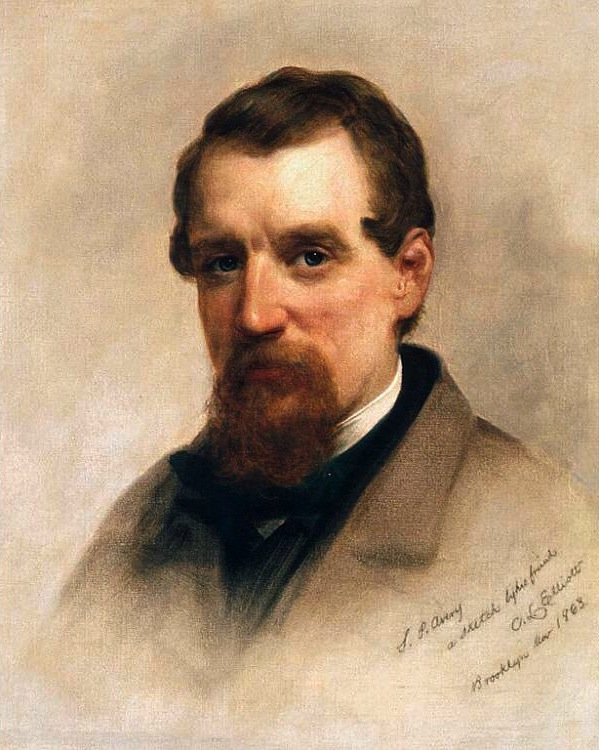
Samuel Putnam Avery, c. 1863

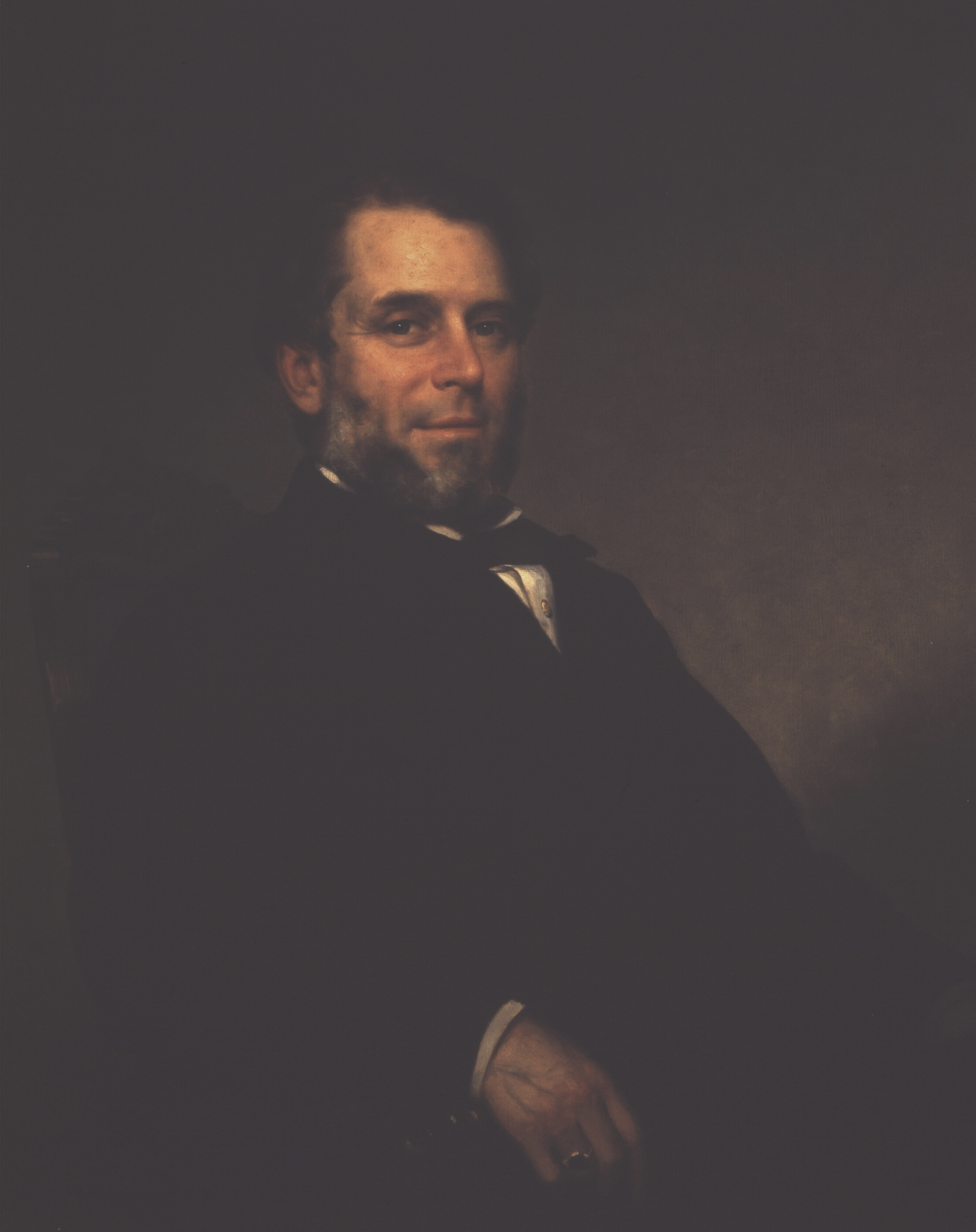
George Washington Riggs, c. 1867
