= Thomas Ramsey (mayor) =

Sir Thomas Ramsey (1510/11–1590) was a merchant, and an Alderman of London from 1566 to 1590. He was knighted, served as Sheriff in 1567–68 and Lord Mayor in 1577–78. His second wife Mary Ramsey was a noted philanthropist.

== Life ==
Ramsey was born in Eaton Bridge, Kent (now Edenbridge) in 1510 or 1511, though details of his home have not been found. He was the second son of John Ramsey, with an elder brother William Ramsey, and three sisters, Tyrell, Hebbarde and Elizabeth.

Little has survived of Ramsey's life and career, and a primary source, is F.W. Fairholt's study of Ramsey's wills and possessions in which he states that "the incidents of Sir Thomas Ramsey's career have not descended to our time" Thomas's second wife, Lady Mary Ramsey, unlike her husband, has an entry in the Dictionary of National Biography, and this gives some additional information.

After being apprenticed in London, he became a freeman of the Worshipful Company of Grocers between 1537 and 1539, and married Alice (1492/93–1578), daughter of Bevis Lea of Enfield in Staffordshire in 1540. As a successful merchant, in 1566 he purchased a house "with a very fair forefront" in Lombard Street, formerly the home of Sir Martin Bowes, which was also his place of business

Sir Thomas refers to "my mansion house" in his will, and apparently it was a large important building, having a garden to the rear and a lodge at the entry to a courtyard. A well was in the yard, and the existence of a 'spice house' is recorded. He was elected Alderman in December 1566, serving for Cheap ward, was Lord Mayor in 1577–78, was knighted in May 1578, then served for Cornhill ward from 1588. He maintained an excellent attendance record as an Alderman, and became one of the richest men in London.

The Ramseys had no children and Alice died on 15 January 1577. The following year Thomas married Mary, eldest daughter of William Dale, a Bristol merchant. She had formerly been married to Thomas Avery of Berden, Essex, who had been associated with Thomas Cromwell. They had no children and Thomas Avery had died in 1576. Avery bequeathed a gold locket with a picture of Cromwell to Ralph Sadler.

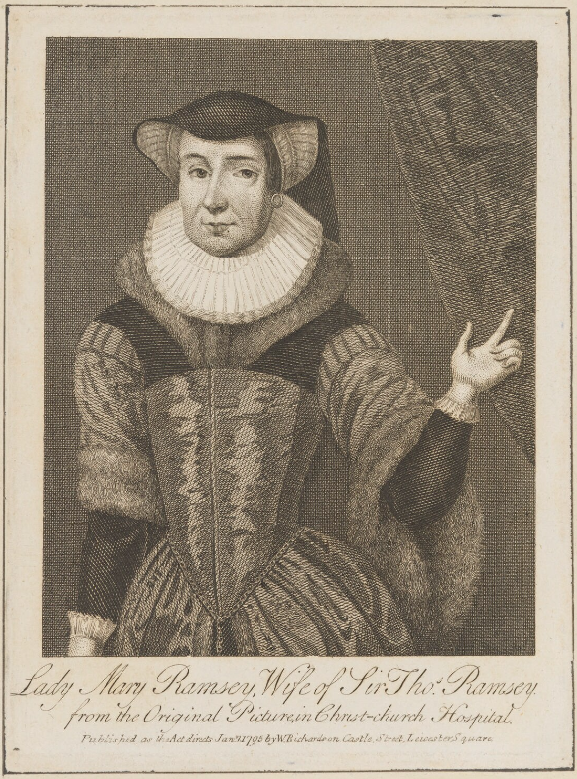
Mary, Lady Ramsey

Sir Thomas, known as "Rich Ramsey" was active in charitable work, and was Governor of St Bartholomew's Hospital from 1559 to 1560 until 1560–61. He was also an auditor for St. Barts in 1560–61 and was the president of Christ's Hospital from 1582 to 1583 until his death in 1590. Sir Thomas made two wills, one concerning personal possessions, signed on 20 September 1585, and the second, concerning property signed on 9 July 1586. Money was left to relatives, acquaintances, servants and to the poor, including "to the poore inhabitauntes of Eaton Bridge in the countie of Kent tenne poundes". Prisons, hospitals and the Grocers' Company are remembered. After legacies and bequests, half of the residue was to go to Lady Mary, with the other half to be shared by named relatives. On Lady Mary's death, the estate was to go to named relatives. "The Trewe Inventorye of all the moveable goodes, househoulde stuffe and plate, which were latelie the goodes and chattels of Sir Thomas Ramsey…" dated 1590, lists in detail and room by room, the furnishings and contents of the house, with the estimated value of each item or set of items, in pounds, shillings and pence.

An indication of Ramsey's importance and influence is revealed in his will, where his executors are reminded that a loan of £550 to Robert, Earl of Leicester (Queen Elizabeth's favourite), was due in January 1587. A further indication is the inclusion of the Ramseys in the play by Thomas Heywood (registered and printed 1605–06) "If you know not me, you know nobody; or, The troubles of Queene Elizabeth". They appear as a wealthy man with his wife as peacemaker, and Alexander Nowell, the Dean of St. Paul's as arbitrator in the dispute and seven-year-long lawsuit between Sir Thomas and the more famous Sir Thomas Gresham, the founder of the Royal Exchange.

There were no children from the marriage, and after Thomas' death on 15 May 1590 Lady Mary carried on his charitable work and was a benefactress to Christ's Hospital and to Queen Elizabeth's Hospital, Bristol. Sir Thomas was buried in his parish church St Mary Woolnoth (on the south side of Lombard Street), with a monument at the east end of the chancel. His first wife, Dame Alice, was also buried there, and the monument, which was erected in 1596, also mentioned his second wife, Dame Mary. The church was destroyed in the Great Fire of London in 1666, and although it was reinstated, together with the tomb, it was demolished in 1716 and a replacement church was built. Lady Mary died in November 1601.
