= Samuel Putnam Avery =

American connoisseur and art dealer (1822–1904)

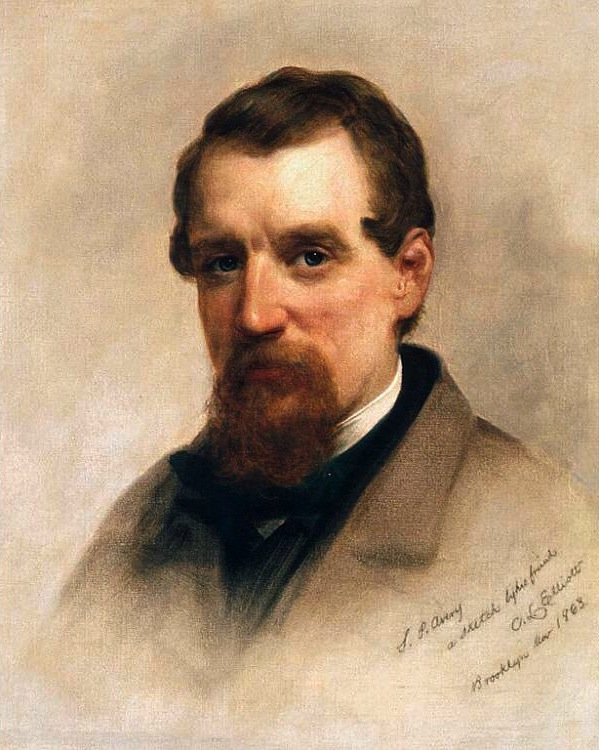
- Samuel Putnam Avery, portrait by Charles Loring Elliott,1863
- Born: March 17, 1822; New York City
- Died: August 11, 1904 (aged 82); New York City
- Occupation: Art dealer
- Spouse(s): Mary Ann Ogden Avery
- Children: 2

Samuel Putnam Avery (1822–1904) was an American connoisseur and art dealer.

== Biography ==
Samuel Putnam Avery was born on March 17, 1822, in New York City, where he studied wood and copper engraving and was extensively employed by leading publishers. He married the artist-collector Mary Ann Ogden in 1844 and began business as an art dealer in 1865. In 1867, Avery was appointed commissioner in charge of the American art department of the Exposition Universelle in Paris. He was among the founders, and for a long time a trustee of the Metropolitan Museum of Art, and was a life member of several important scientific, artistic and educational associations. He founded the Avery Architectural Library at Columbia University in memory of his son Henry Ogden Avery, an architect of note who died in 1890. In 1900, he donated his collection of 17,775 etchings and lithographs to the New York Public Library.

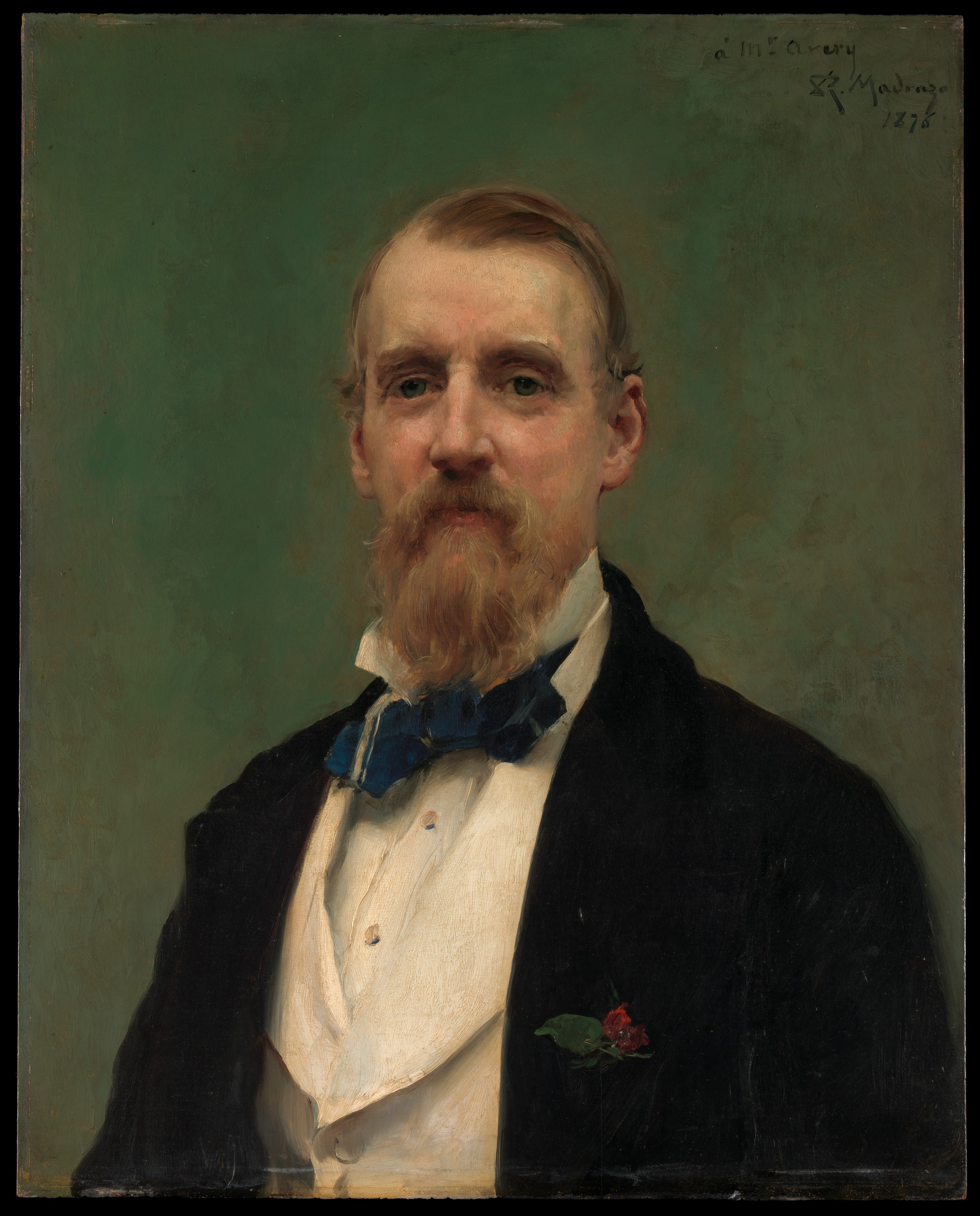
Samuel P. Avery (1822–1904) (1876) by Spanish artist Raimundo de Madrazo y Garreta

Avery died at his home in New York City on August 11, 1904.
