= Gordon Ramsay (disambiguation) =

Gordon Ramsay (born 1966) is a Scottish celebrity chef.

Gordon Ramsay or Ramsey may also refer to:

== People ==
- Gordon Ramsay (footballer) (1929–2011), Australian footballer
- Gordon Ramsay (politician) (born 1964), Australian politician
- Gordon Ramsey (1930–1993), American actor
- Gordon Ramsay, chief of police for the Wichita Police Department in the U.S. state of Kansas during 2016–2022

== Restaurants ==
- Gordon Ramsay at Claridge's, Mayfair, London, England, UK
- Gordon Ramsay Plane Food, Heathrow Airport Terminal 5, London, England, UK
- Restaurant Gordon Ramsay, Royal Hospital Road, Chelsea, London, England, UK

== See also ==
- List of restaurants owned or operated by Gordon Ramsay
