= Matt Ramsey =

Matt or Matthew Ramsey may refer to:

- Matthew Ramsey (born 1977), singer-songwriter and member of the band Old Dominion
- Matt Ramsey (baseball) (born 1989), American MLB pitcher
- Matt Ramsey (politician), American politician in the Georgia House of Representatives
- Peter North (actor) (born 1957), pornographic actor who has performed under the name Matt Ramsey
- Matthew Ramsey, film editor on True Blue
- Matthew Ramsey (historian), recipient of a Guggenheim Fellowship in 1991
- Matt Ramsey (The O.C.), a recurring character from the American television drama The O.C.
