= Alexander Ramsay (minister) =

Alexander Ramsay (1638–1702) was a Scottish minister who served as minister of St Giles Cathedral and other senior positions in the Church of Scotland.

== Life ==
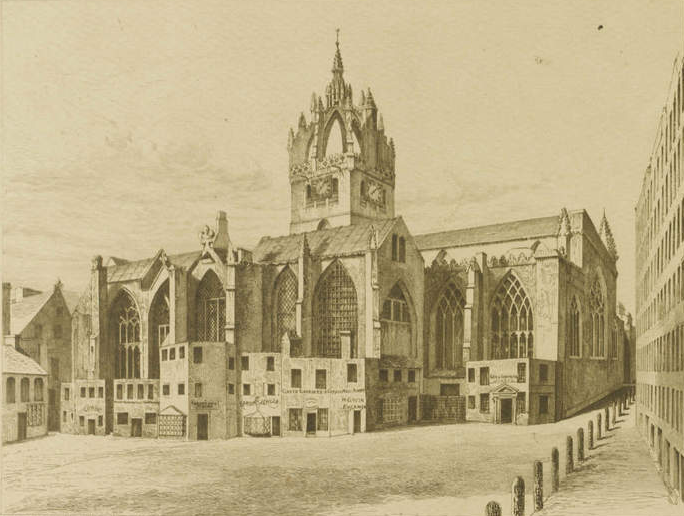
St Giles in the 18th century

He was born in 1638, probably in Aberdeenshire. He studied at Marischal College in Aberdeen and graduated MA in 1658.

He was ordained as minister of Auchinleck in 1663. Whilst in Auchinleck his house was robbed and his family was threatened. The parish was fined 3500 merks by the Privy Council due to this incident. He was translated to second charge of Greyfriars Kirk in Edinburgh in 1669.

In 1672 he moved to second charge of St Giles High Church before returning to Greyfriars in 1674. In 1681 he moved back to St Giles, but as first charge of the Old Kirk quadrant. He was suspended (along with scores of others) in 1689 for expressing his fears of Popery within the emerging Scottish church and for refusing to pray for the incoming King William & Queen Mary but instead praying for King James and the bishops. He may therefore be described as a Jacobite.

He died on 17 August 1702.

== Family ==
He firstly married Jean McLauchlin, who died in 1689 and was buried in Greyfriars Kirkyard.

He secondly married Jean Orrock, widow of Gilbert Lyon, minister of Kinghorn. By the latter he had a son Robert Ramsay (c.1695-1716) who became an Edinburgh merchant (apprenticed to Alexander Callendar in 1709). His daughter Jean Ramsay married Alexander Falconer, an Edinburgh advocate, in 1720. His widow Jean married Robert Cheyne (1650-1735) minister of Girthon near Kirkcudbright.
