= Morton Ramsay =

Scottish footballer (1926–1983)

Personal information
- Full name: David Morton Ramsay
- Date of birth: 12 May 1926
- Place of birth: Kelvin, Scotland
- Date of death: 1983 (aged 56)
- Place of death: Glasgow, Scotland
- Position: Goalkeeper

Youth career
- Shawlands Academy

Senior career*
Years	Team	Apps	(Gls)
1942–1955	Queen's Park	56	(0)
- Ashfield

International career
1949	Scotland Amateurs	1	(0)
- * Club domestic league appearances and goals

David Morton Ramsay (12 May 1926 – 1983) was a Scottish footballer who played as a goalkeeper in the Scottish League for Queen's Park. He was capped by Scotland at amateur level.
