= David Ramsey (disambiguation) =

David Ramsey (born 1971) is an American actor.

David Ramsey may also refer to:

- Dave Ramsey (born 1960), American radio show host and businessman
- David Ramsey (musician) (1939–2008), organist for the Memphis Redbirds

== See also ==
- David Ramsay (disambiguation)
- David Rumsey (disambiguation)
