= George Ramsay =

George Ramsay may refer to:

- George Ramsay (footballer, born 1855) (1855–1935), Scottish football player and manager, associated with Aston Villa FC
- George Ramsay (English Army officer) (1652–1705), English Army officer
- George Ramsay (footballer, born 1892) (1892–1918), Scottish footballer (Rangers FC, Partick Thistle FC)
- George Ramsay, 8th Earl of Dalhousie (died 1787)
- George Ramsay, 9th Earl of Dalhousie (1770–1838), Scottish soldier and colonial administrator
- George Ramsay, 12th Earl of Dalhousie (1806–1880), British naval officer
- George Gilbert Ramsay (1839–1921), professor at the University of Glasgow
- George D. Ramsay (1802–1882), U.S. Army officer
- George Ramsay known as Roy Ramsay (sailor) (born 1912, date of death unknown), Olympic sailor
- George Ramsay, printer active in Edinburgh (fl. 1811–1823), founder of George Ramsay and Company
