= Robert Ramsey =

Robert may refer to:

- Robert Ramsey (composer) (1590s–1644), English composer and organist
- Robert Ramsey (congressman) (1780–1849), United States congressman from Pennsylvania

== See also ==
- Bob Ramsey (disambiguation)
- Robert Ramsay (disambiguation)
