= William Ramsey =

William or Bill Ramsey may refer to:

== Politics ==
- William Ramsey (Pennsylvania politician) (1779–1831), United States Congressman from Pennsylvania
- William Sterrett Ramsey (1810–1840), United States congressman from Pennsylvania
- William Marion Ramsey (1846–1937), American politician and judge in Oregon
- William T. Ramsey (1873–1937), American politician from Pennsylvania

== Sports ==
- Bill Ramsey (baseball) (1920–2008), Major League baseball outfielder
- Bill Ramsey (rugby league) (1943–2020), British rugby league footballer

== Other ==
- William of Ramsey (fl. 1219), English hagiographer and Benedictine monk
- William de Ramsey (fl. 1323 – d.1349), English master mason and architect
- William Ramsay (Royal Navy officer) (1796–1871), British admiral
- William F. Ramsey (1855–1922), Justice of the Supreme Court of Texas
- Bill Ramsey (singer) (William McCreery Ramsey, 1931–2021), German-American jazz and pop singer and actor

== See also ==
- William Ramsay (disambiguation)
