= Paul G. Ramsey =

American physician and academic administrator

Paul G. Ramsey is an American physician, medical educator, and academic administrator. He was chief executive officer (CEO) of UW Medicine and as dean of the University of Washington School of Medicine from 1997 to 2022. Previously, he was chair of the University of Washington Department of Medicine from 1990 to 1997. Ramsey retired in July 2022.

== Education and training ==
Ramsey was born in Pittsburgh, Pennsylvania. He became interested in medicine during high school after working a summer job assisting a pathologist.

He received a bachelor's degree from Harvard College in 1971 (biochemistry, honors) and an M.D. from Harvard Medical School in 1975, where he was elected to Alpha Omega Alpha.

He completed residency training in internal medicine at Massachusetts General Hospital and the University of Washington, and was chief medical resident at UW Medical Center from 1980 to 1981. He first came to the University of Washington as a senior fellow in infectious diseases in 1978.

== University of Washington career ==
Ramsey joined the UW faculty in 1980 as an acting instructor in medicine and became a full professor in 1991. He became chair of the Department of Medicine in 1990; under his leadership, the department’s research programs attracted approximately $63 million per year in sponsored research support by 1997. In 1995, he was appointed the first holder of the Robert G. Petersdorf Endowed Chair in Medicine.

In 1997, Ramsey was named vice president for medical affairs, dean of the School of Medicine, and CEO of UW Medicine. During his tenure, UW Medicine developed as an integrated system including the UW School of Medicine, UW Medical Center, Harborview Medical Center, Valley Medical Center, UW Physicians, UW Primary Care, Airlift Northwest, and affiliations with Fred Hutchinson Cancer Center and Seattle Children's Hospital. Key accomplishments included establishing institutes such as the Institute for Protein Design and Institute for Health Metrics and Evaluation, doubling faculty, and increasing research grants to over $1 billion annually. Operating revenue grew 280% to $1.9 billion by 2021, and donor support rose nearly 600%. He emphasized interdisciplinary collaboration, equity in care, and innovations like electronic medical records.

Ramsey retired in July 2022.

== National roles and honors ==
Ramsey’s research has focused on assessment of physicians’ clinical competence, including an early large-scale study begun in 1983 examining the relationship between American Board of Internal Medicine certification and clinical practice. He was on national boards and committees including the National Board of Medical Examiners and the American Board of Internal Medicine, and was a member of the Fred Hutchinson Cancer Research Center Board of Trustees from 1990 to 1994.

He received the John P. Hubbard Award from the National Board of Medical Examiners (1999). In 2000, he was elected to the Institute of Medicine (now the National Academy of Medicine).

In 2023, the Paul G. Ramsey Endowed Deanship was established with $20 million from philanthropists including Steve and Connie Ballmer and the Bill & Melinda Gates Foundation, honoring his commitment to health equity and innovation.

== Personal life ==
Ramsey is married to physician and researcher Bonnie W. Ramsey. He rowed competitively while at Harvard and has continued rowing, including participation in masters events such as the Head of the Charles Regatta.

== Selected publications ==
- Ramsey PG, Wenrich MD, Carline JD, Inui TS, Larson EB, LoGerfo JP. “Use of peer ratings to evaluate physician performance.” JAMA. 1993;269(13):1655–1660.
- Ramsey PG, Miller ED. “A single mission for academic medicine: improving health.” JAMA. 2009;301(14):1475–1476.
- “The JIM interview. Paul G. Ramsey, MD.” Journal of Investigative Medicine. 1998;46(5):192–196.
