= David Rumsey (disambiguation) =

David Rumsey is an American map collector.

David Rumsey may also refer to:

- David Rumsey (politician) (1810-1883), United States Representative from New York
- David Rumsey (organist) (1939–2017), Australian organist and composer
- Dave Rumsey, musician in the group Earthsuit

== See also ==
- David Ramsey (disambiguation)
- David Ramsay (disambiguation)
