= Mary Ann Ogden Avery =

US art collector and museum benefactor (1825–1911)

Mary Ann Ogden
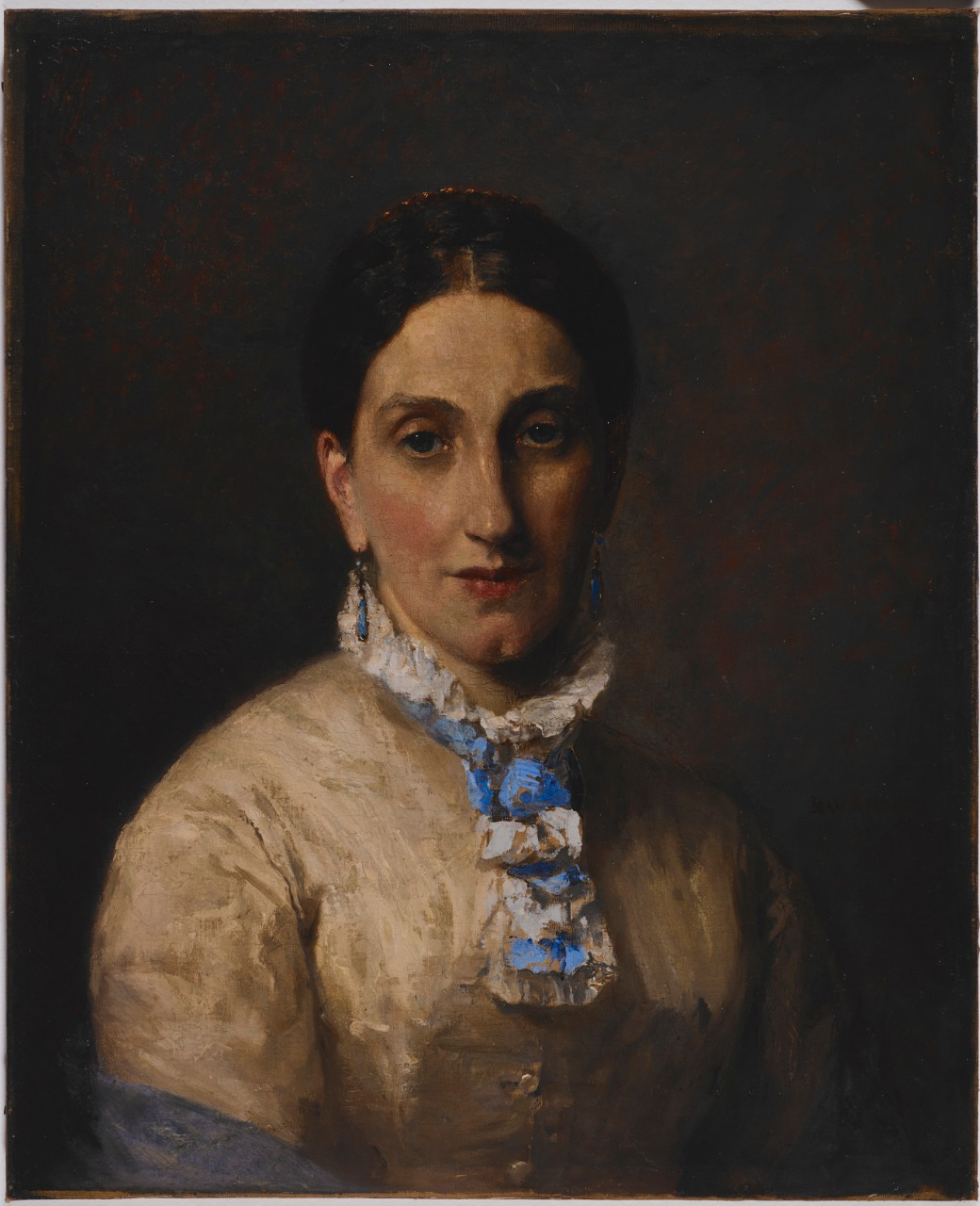
- Portrait of Mrs. S.P. Avery by Jean-Ernest Aubert
- Born: December 1, 1825; New York City
- Died: April 29, 1911 (aged 85); Hartford

Mary Ann Ogden Avery (1825–1911) was an art collector and museum benefactor active in New York City. She left works to the Metropolitan Museum of Art and Columbia University.

Ogden was born in New York and married the engraver-art dealer Samuel Putnam Avery in 1844. Together they had six children. In 1857 the couple lost their four-year-old daughter Emma and soon after Mary began to accompany her husband on yearly trips to purchase art on speculation for resale on the New York market. The couple commissioned works by living artists and corresponded with various artists in their acquaintance. Mary was herself a watercolorist and collected spoons as a hobby, which she later donated to the Metropolitan. The catalog, dated 1898, mentions the places she collected spoons: universal exhibitions of Paris 1867, 1878, 1889, and of Vienna 1873. Bric-à-brac shops in London, Chester, Liverpool, Paris, Lille, Rouen, Blois, Brussels, Antwerp, Amsterdam, Hague, Haarlem, Berlin, Frankfort, Nuremberg, Düsseldorf, and Prague.

In 1886 the couple lost another daughter, Fanny, and began to make charitable donations. Their Avery Hospital in Hartford was probably the result of Fanny's death there. Their son Henry had studied art and later became an architect. Upon his early death in 1890, the couple commissioned the Avery memorial library in his name for Columbia University. Their daughter Ellen died in 1893 and their eldest child Henrietta died in 1900. The couple continued living with their only surviving child Samuel Jr. in their New York City gallery, who took over the family business. When Mary's husband died in 1904 she oversaw the donation of their collection to the Metropolitan and later moved with her son to Hartford, where she died.

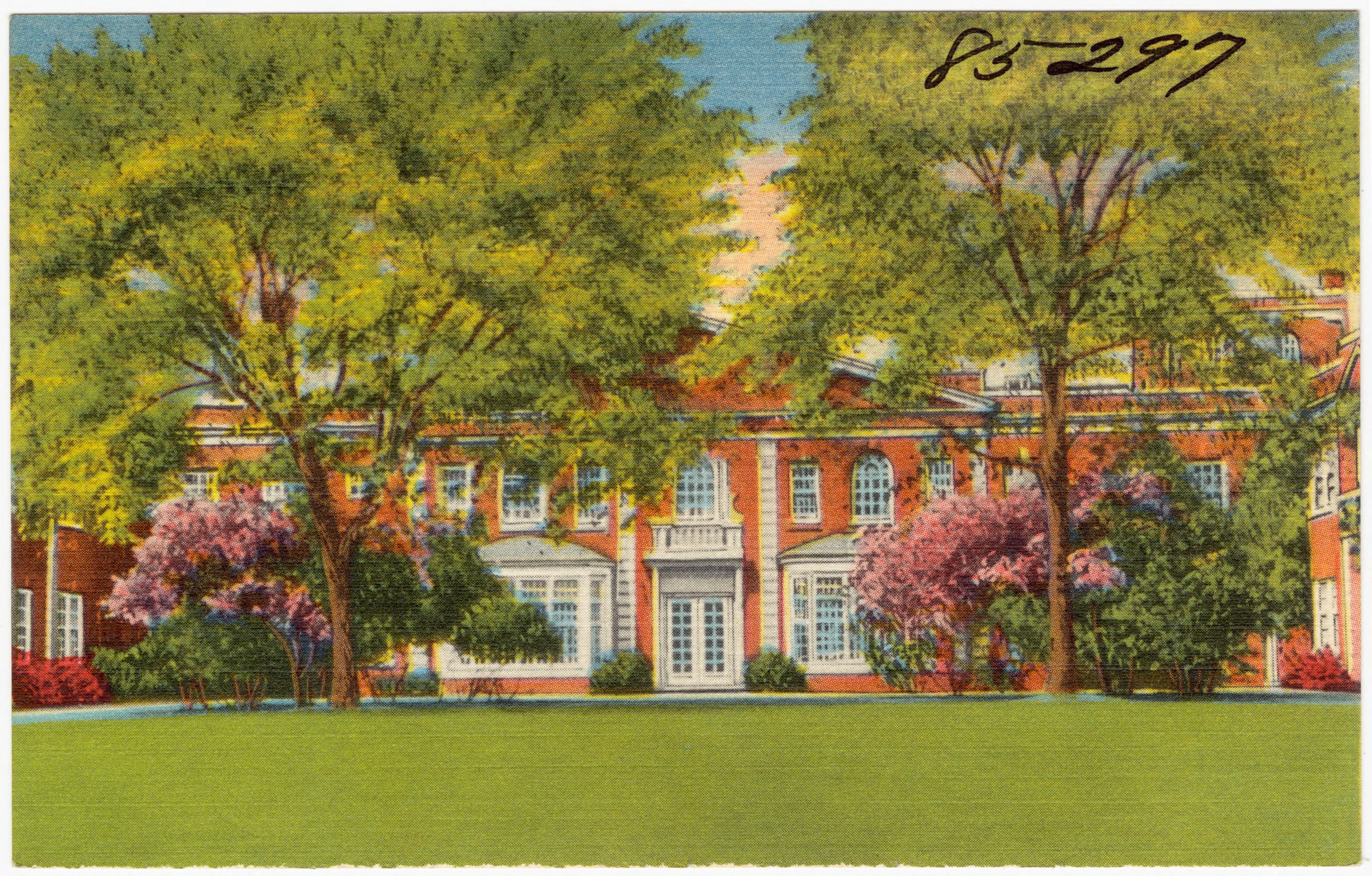
Postcard of the "Mary Ogden Avery Convalescent Hospital" in Hartford

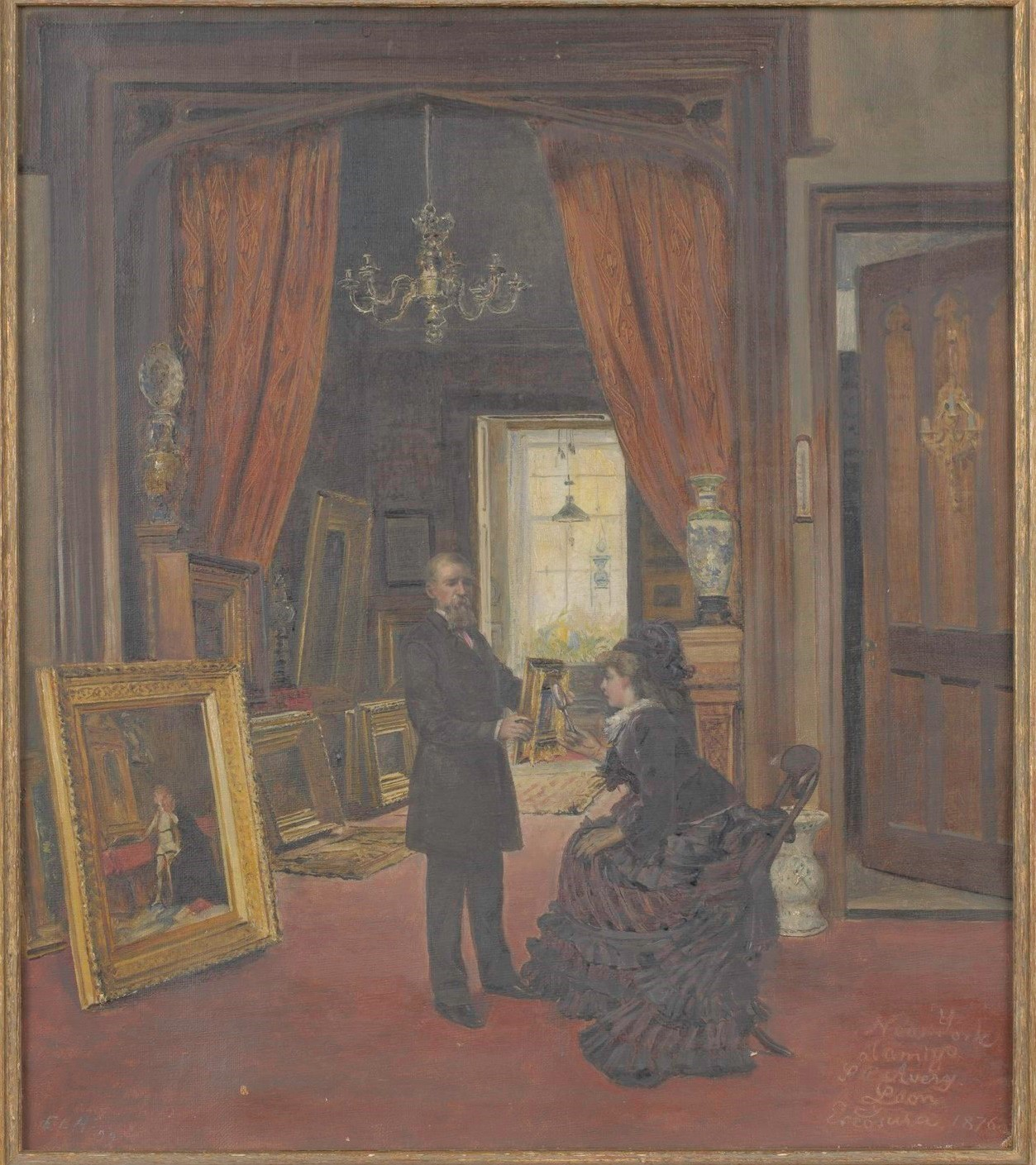
Mr. & Mrs. S.P. Avery in their gallery, by Ignacio León y Escosura

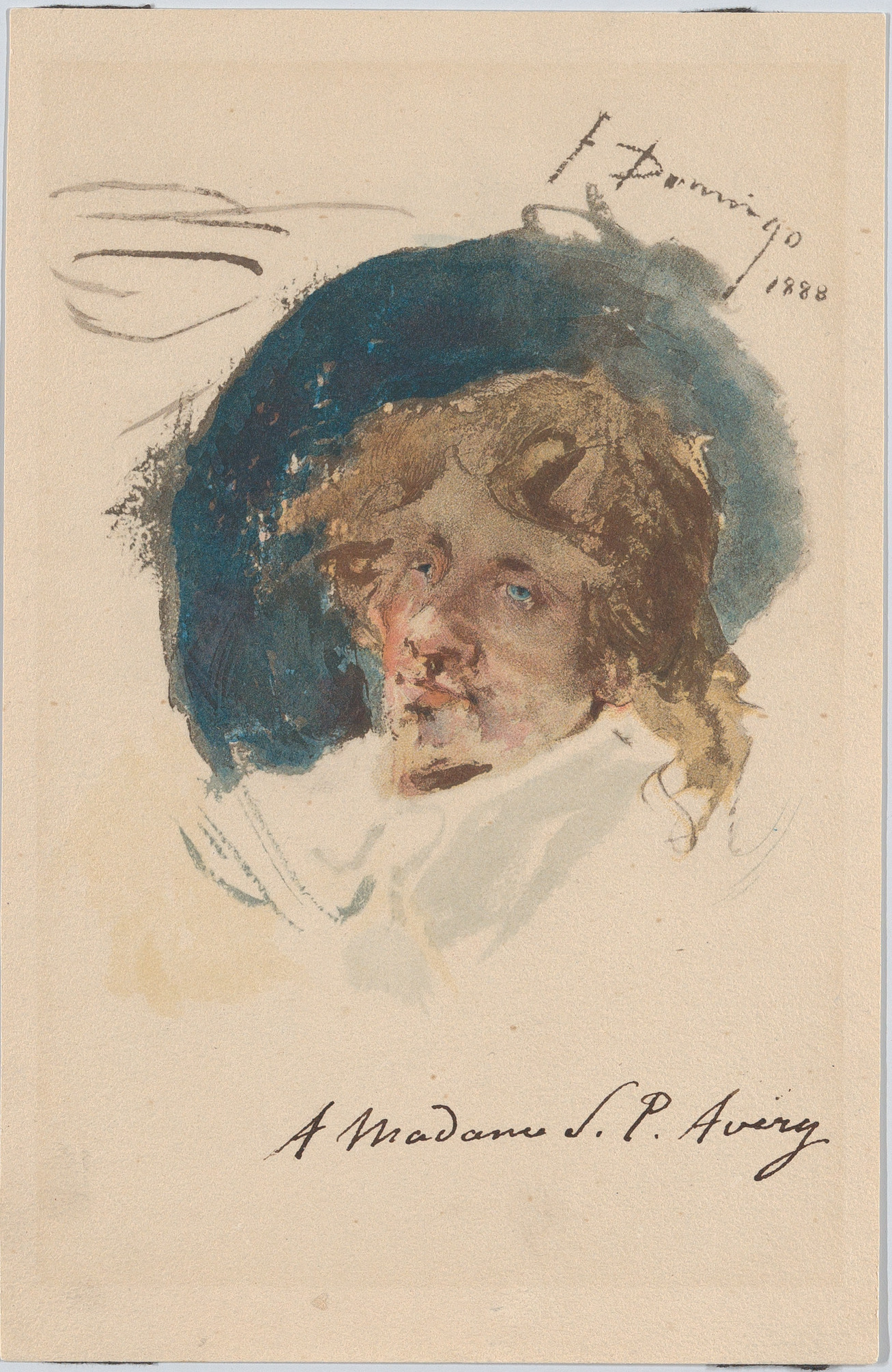
Litho of a watercolor by Mary Ann Ogden Avery

== Spoon collection ==
A few notable spoons from her collection:

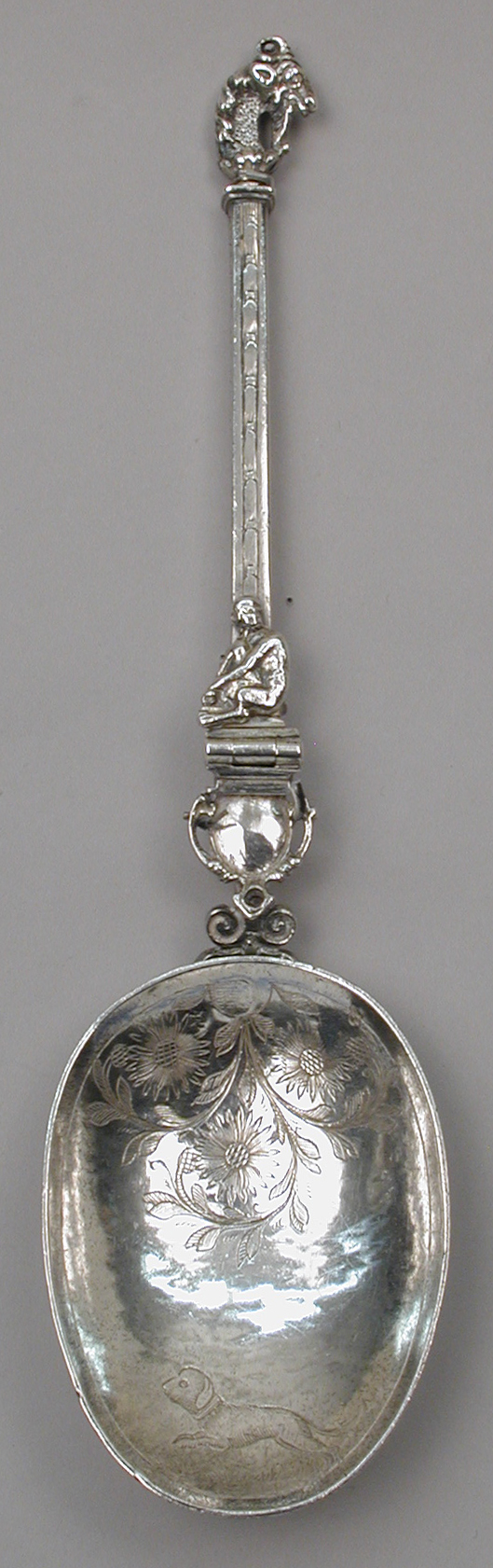
1624 spoon and fork combination, Dutch

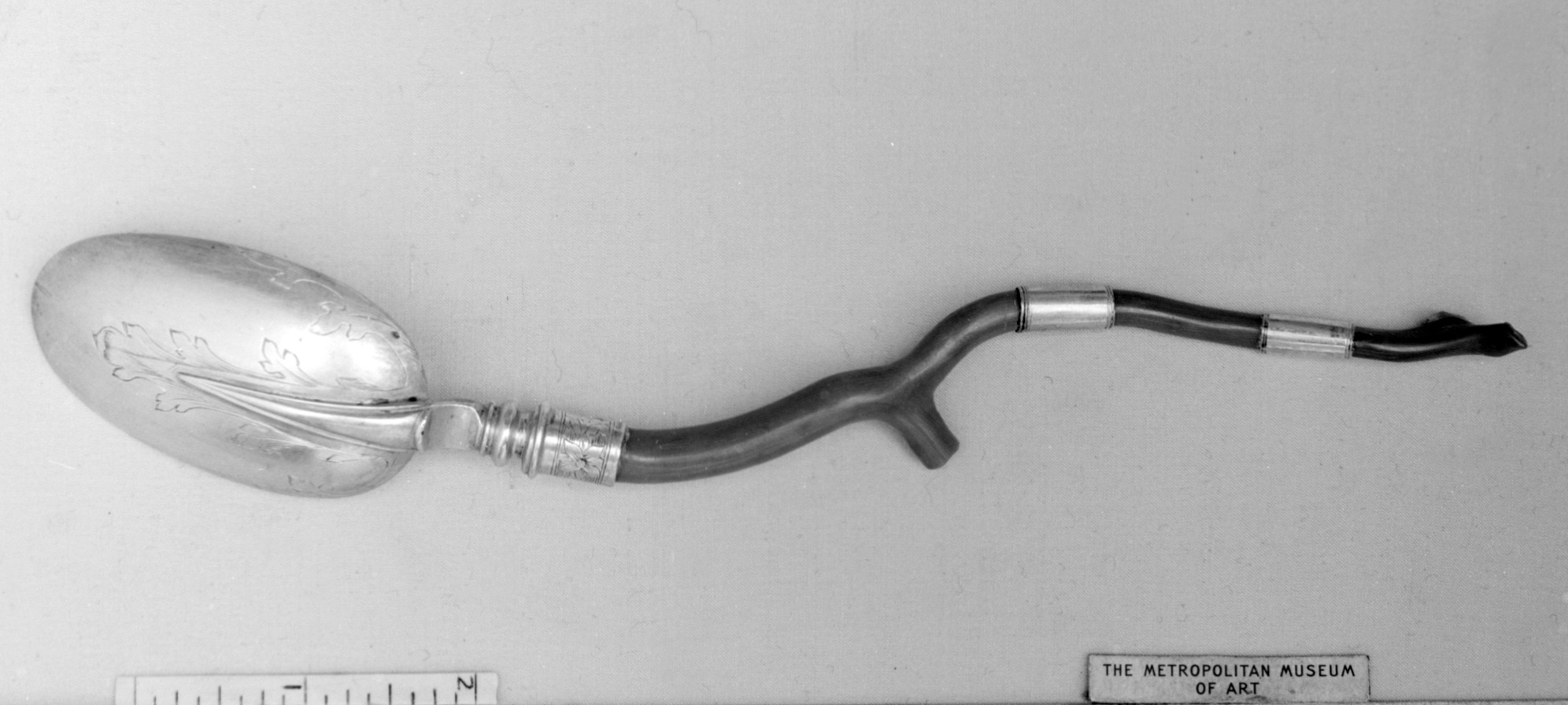
Silver and coral spoon 17th-18th century, probably Dutch or German

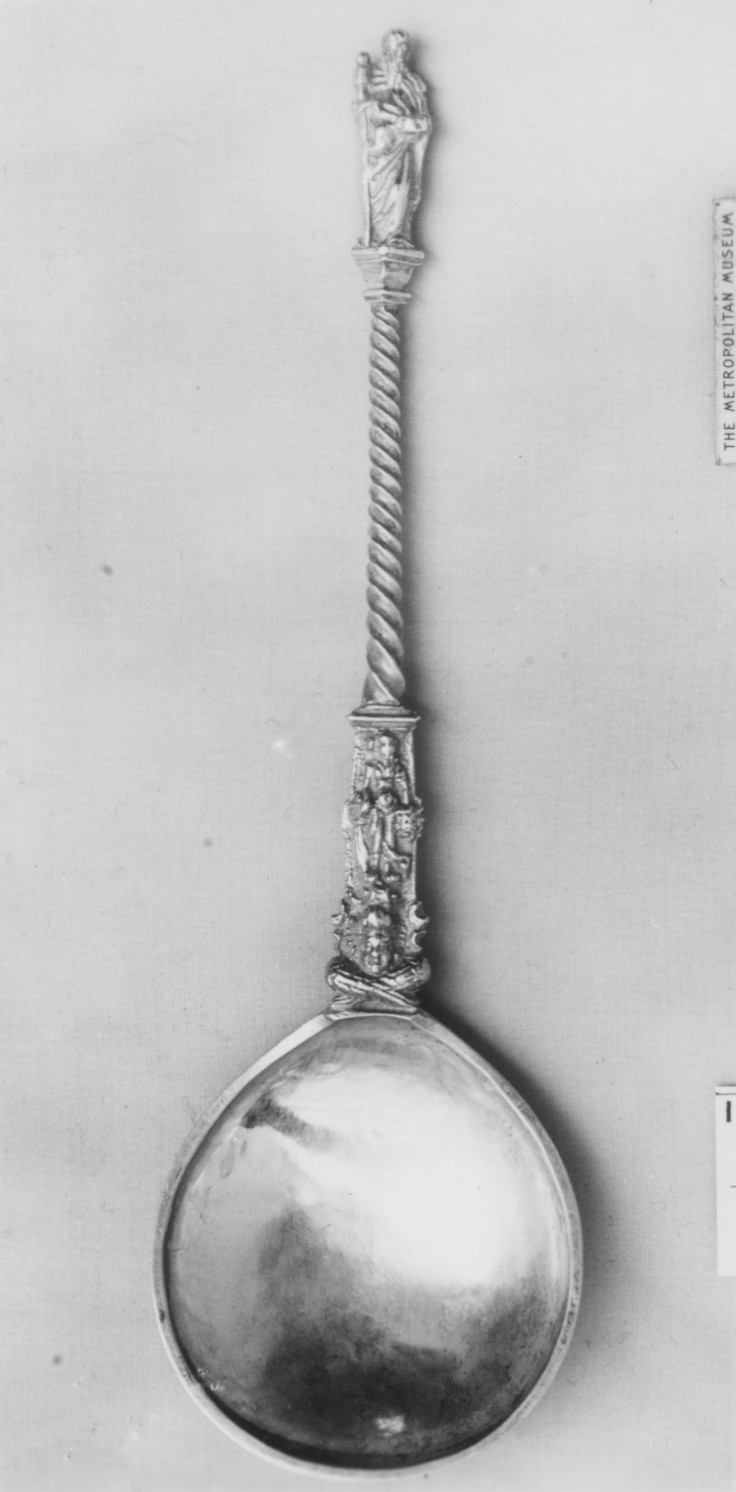
1629 Dutch (Enkhuizen) apostle spoon
