= Brad Rumsey =

American football coach (born 1986)

Current position
- Title: Offensive coordinator
- Team: Olivet
- Conference: MIAA

Biographical details
- Born: March 4, 1986 (age 40); Concord, Michigan, U.S.
- Education: Hillsdale College (B.S., 2008)

Playing career
- 2004–2007: Hillsdale
- Positions: Offensive lineman, long snapper

Coaching career (HC unless noted)
- 2008: Hillsdale (SA)
- 2009: Concord HS (MI) (OL/DL)
- 2010: Ave Maria (TE/AOL)
- 2011: Trine (TE/AOL)
- 2012: Olivet (DL)
- 2013–2016: Olivet (OL)
- 2017–present: Olivet (OC)

Head coaching record
- Overall: 0–0 (college)
- Tournaments: 0–0 (NCAA D–III playoffs)

Brad Rumsey (born March 4, 1986) is an American football coach. He is the offensive coordinator at Olivet College in Olivet, Michigan.
