= Ontario Liberal Party candidates in the 2003 Ontario provincial election =

Listing of candidates

The Ontario Liberal Party is a political party in the Canadian province of Ontario.

The party governed the province from 1871 to 1905, 1934 to 1943 and 1985 to 1990. It returned to power in 2003 by winning a majority government in that year's provincial election.

The party ran a full slate of 103 candidates in the 2003 election, seventy-two of whom were elected. Several candidates have their own biography pages. Information about others may be found here.

== Candidates ==
- Algoma—Manitoulin: Mike Brown
- Ancaster—Dundas—Flamborough—Aldershot: Ted McMeekin
- Barrie—Simcoe—Bradford: Mike Ramsay
- Beaches—East York: Monica Purdy
- Burlington: Mark Fuller
- Lanark—Carleton: Marianne Wilkinson
- Nepean—Carleton: Rod Vanier
- Ottawa Centre: Richard Patten
- Ottawa—Orléans: Phil McNeely
- Ottawa South: Dalton McGuinty
- Ottawa—Vanier: Madeleine Meilleur
- Ottawa West—Nepean: Jim Watson
- Trinity—Spadina: Nellie Pedro
