= Elizabeth Stasny =

Expert on survey methodology

Elizabeth Ann Stasny is a professor emeritus of statistics at Ohio State University. She is an expert on survey methodology and particularly on missing data in surveys.

== Education ==
Stasny earned her Ph.D. in 1983 at Carnegie Mellon University. Her dissertation, Estimating Gross Flows in Labor Force Participation Using Data From the Canadian Labour Force Survey, was supervised by Stephen Fienberg.

== Contributions ==
With Dennis K. Pearl, Stasny is the author of Experiments in Statistical Concepts (Kendall Hunt, 1994).

In 2010 she became one of 18 experts named by US Attorney General Eric Holder to found the Science Advisory Board of the Office of Justice Programs.

== Recognition ==
Stasny was elected as a Fellow of the American Statistical Association in 1997.
