= David Prophet Ramsay =

Scottish painter (1888–1944)

- Born: 6 July 1888; Perth, Scotland
- Died: 11 January 1944 (aged 55); Dunkeld, Scotland

David Prophet Ramsay (6 July 1888 – 11 January 1944) was an early-mid 20th century Scottish painter specialising in portrait, figure and, occasionally, landscape painting.

== Early life ==
David Prophet Ramsay was born in Perth, Scotland in 1888, the sixth and youngest child of Alexander Ramsay, a china merchant, and Jean Ann Prophet.

He was educated at Perth Academy before joining Coates Bros of Perth, training as a textile designer between 1904 and 1909. In 1909 he entered Glasgow School of Art, studying under Maurice Greiffenhagen and Paul Artôt. He gained his diploma in 1913.

That same year he won the Haldane Travel Scholarship, the top prize for a senior student. He used the proceeds to travel throughout Europe, visiting Belgium, Holland, France, Italy and Spain.

== Active service ==
In December 1915, Ramsay enlisted in the 4th Battalion, the Black Watch, as a Private. On 31 July 1917, shortly after his promotion to Lieutenant, he was very seriously wounded at the Battle of Pilckem Ridge. A shell ripped off much of his left side, including his left lung. He was nearly left for dead; however, his life was saved by the efforts of a Canadian doctor.

He was gazetted out of the army in 1919.

During his time in the army, Ramsay produced a series of caricatures of his fellow officers, under the pseudonym “Sam Ray” (an anagram of his surname).

== Artist ==
On his return to Perth, Ramsay set up a studio as a portrait and figure painter, at 49 York Place.

In 1923 Ramsay married restaurateur Beatrice Elizabeth Hewat whose late father had run the Windsor Restaurant in St John Street, Perth.

In 1930 Ramsay was commissioned to paint the then Princess Elizabeth (subsequently Queen Elizabeth II), the sittings taking place at Glamis Castle.

He was a member of the Perthshire Art Association and the Dundee Art Society (of which he was elected President in 1930) He exhibited his work at numerous exhibitions in the UK, including the Royal Academy (3), Royal Scottish Academy (16), the Royal Glasgow Institute of the Fine Arts (13) and the Walker Art Gallery in Liverpool (5).

== Death ==
David Prophet Ramsay died at his home, Kennacoil House near Dunkeld, on 11 January 1944 aged 55. His early death was hastened by his wartime injuries and heavy smoking.

He is buried close to his final home in the small graveyard at Lagganalachie by Trochry.

== Recognition ==
Ramsay was accorded the first one-person memorial exhibition in Perth Museum and Art Gallery in the summer of 1944.

A second exhibition of Ramsay’s work was mounted in Perth Museum and Art Gallery in 1988 to commemorate the centenary of his birth. This exhibition was accompanied by a short booklet illustrating his life and work.

His work is displayed in a number of public galleries across the UK. However, many of his pictures entered the Perth Museum and Art Gallery collection in 1959 as a bequest from his widow.

== Known works ==
- Self Portrait, Perth Art Gallery
- Asleep, Paisley Museum and Art Galleries
- Mrs Ramsay (recto), Paisley Museum and Art Galleries
- Mrs Ramsay (verso), Paisley Museum and Art Galleries
- William Charles Macpherson of Blairgowrie (1855–1936), Clan Macpherson Museum
- A Lady with a Shawl (Miss Betty Cautley), Royal Scottish Academy of Art & Architecture
- Betty, Perth Art Gallery
- The Artist's Wife, Perth Art Gallery
- A Venetian Canal, Perth Art Gallery
- The Castle and the Cottage, Elcho, Perth Art Gallery
