= Avery Architectural and Fine Arts Library =

World's largest architecture library

Coordinates: 40°48′29.5″N 73°57′39.5″W

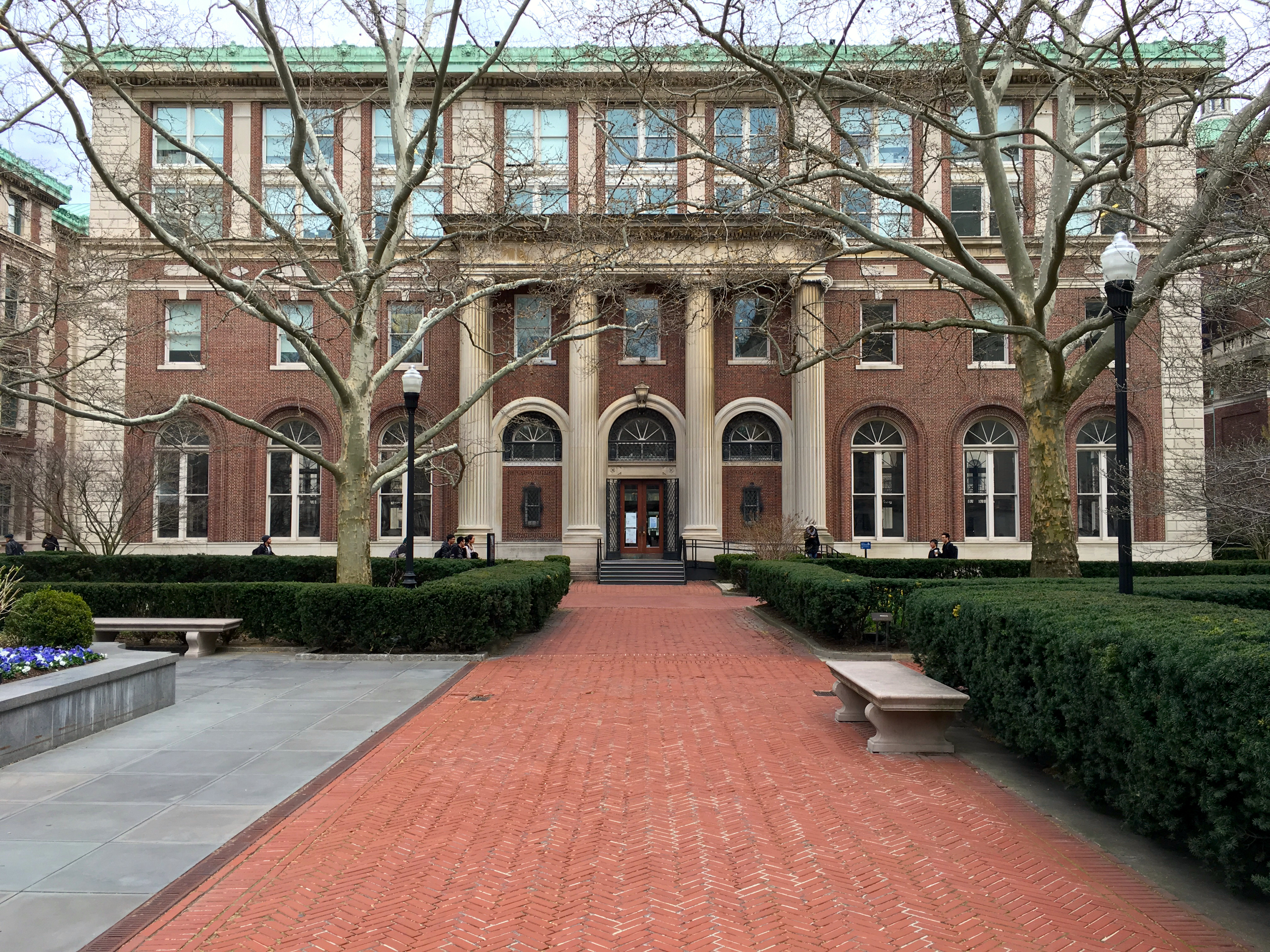
- Avery Hall
- Location: New York City, New York, United States
- Type: Academic library
- Established: 1890
- Branch of: Columbia University Libraries

Collection
- Size: 400,000

Other information
- Website: library.columbia.edu/libraries/avery.html

Avery Architectural and Fine Arts Library, the world's largest architecture library, is located in Avery Hall on the Morningside Heights campus of Columbia University in New York City. Serving Columbia's Graduate School of Architecture, Planning and Preservation and the Department of Art History and Archaeology, Avery Library collects books and periodicals in architecture, historic preservation, art history, painting, sculpting, graphic arts, decorative arts, city planning, real estate, and archaeology, as well as archival materials primarily documenting 19th and 20th-century American architects and architecture. The architectural, fine arts, Ware, and archival collections are non-circulating. The Avery-LC Collection, primarily newer print books, does circulate.

== History ==
Avery Library is named for New York architect Henry Ogden Avery, a friend of William Robert Ware, who was the first professor of architecture at Columbia University in 1881. Soon after Avery's death in 1890, his parents, Samuel Putnam Avery and Mary Ogden Avery, established the library as a memorial to their son. They offered his collection of 2,000 books, mostly in architecture, archaeology, and the decorative arts, many of his original drawings, as well a $30,000 to round out the book collection and to create an endowment. The Library now holds more than 400,000 volumes and receives approximately 900 periodicals, with legacy holdings of approximately 1,900 serial titles.

== Collection ==
Avery Library's collection in architecture literature is among the largest in the world and includes such highlights as the first Western printed book on architecture, De re aedificatoria (1485), by Leone Battista Alberti; Francesco Colonna's Hypnerotomachia Poliphili (1499); works by Giovanni Battista Piranesi; and classics of modernism by Frank Lloyd Wright and Le Corbusier, with the rarest materials held in the library's Classics (Rare Book) Department. In 2012, Avery, in partnership with the Museum of Modern Art, acquired the entire archive of Frank Lloyd Wright.

== Art Properties ==
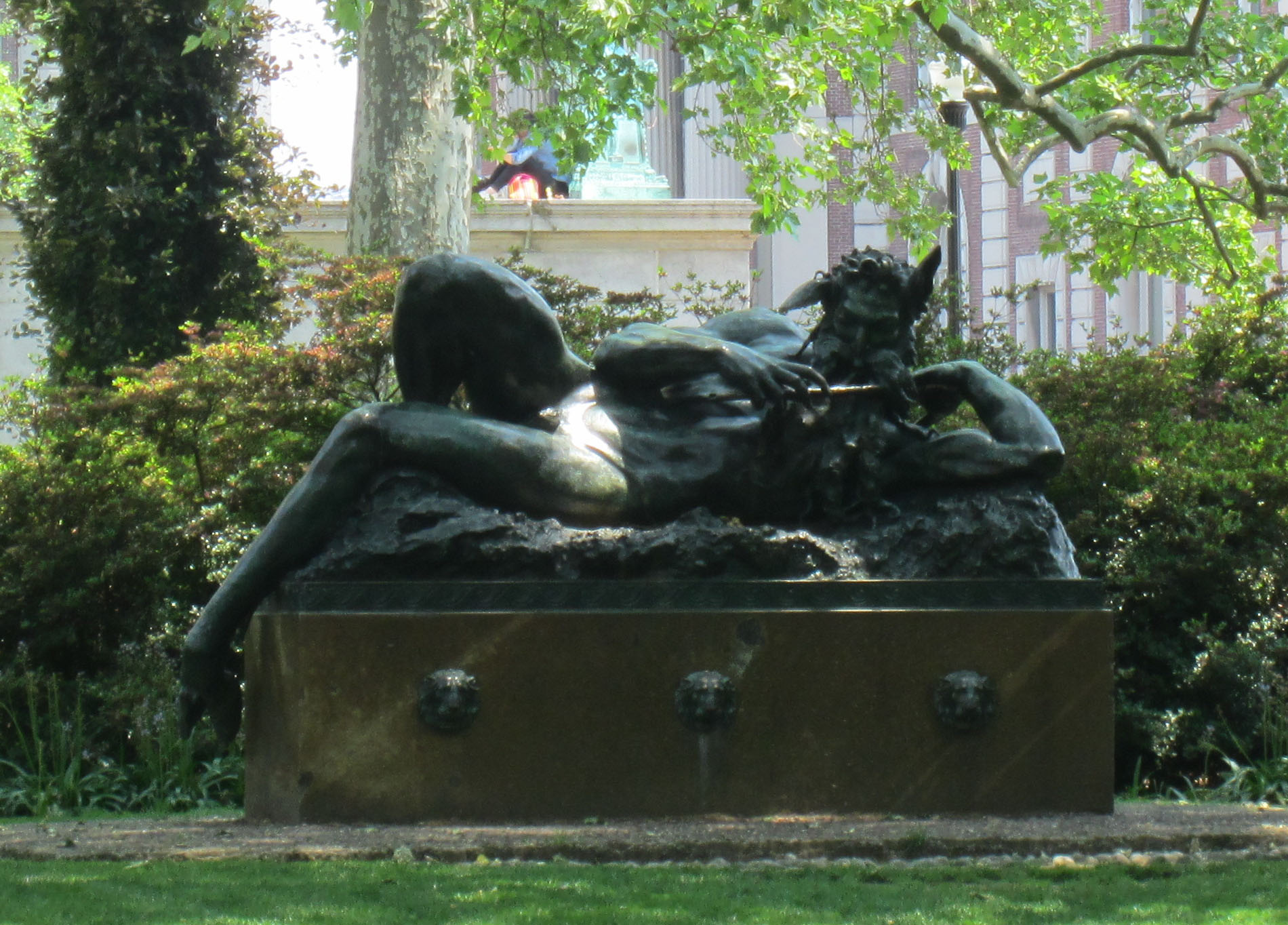
George Grey Barnard, The Great God Pan (bronze, 1898–1899), New York City.

Art Properties oversees the collection of art and cultural artifacts owned by Columbia University. More than 90% of the collection comes from donations and bequests by alumni, faculty, administrators, and students. Comprising more than 13,000 works of art in all media, displayed in buildings at each campus and held in storage, the art collection reflects all cultures and time periods. Highlights from the collection include: the public outdoor sculpture on all the campuses, including works by Auguste Rodin, Daniel Chester French, Henry Moore, and Clement Meadmore; nearly 2,000 paintings, including hundreds of portraits of Columbia administrators and faculty since the eighteenth century; about 1,000 works of fine art photography from daguerreotypes to contemporary works; the Sackler Collection of over 2,000 Asian art works, including Buddhist sculpture in stone, bronze, and polychrome wood from India, China, Japan, and the Ancient Near East; and hundreds of works on paper (drawings, watercolors, prints) and decorative arts (ceramics, tapestries, furniture) from around the globe. Among the larger collections of works by individual artists are photographs and prints by Andy Warhol and the largest collection of paintings, drawings, and watercolors by Florine Stettheimer (1871–1944).

== Classics ==
Avery Classics is the rare book department of Avery Library. It contains approximately 40,000 printed volumes published over seven centuries, from Leon Battista Alberti's De re aedificatoria (1485) to the recent limited edition volume, Olafur Eliasson’s Your House (2006). The Classics collection also has important holdings of manuscripts, broadsides, photographs, periodicals, graphic suites—including Giovanni Battista Piranesi's Carceri (Prisons) and Vedute di Roma (Views of Rome)—and printed ephemera. Notable special collections within Classics include the Trade Catalog Collection, which is one of the largest collections of catalogs of the American building trades anywhere, and the American View Book Collection, which includes books, pamphlets, and brochures that document cities, towns, and buildings throughout the United States. While an appointment is necessary, Avery Classics is open to the general public for research.

== Drawings & Archives ==
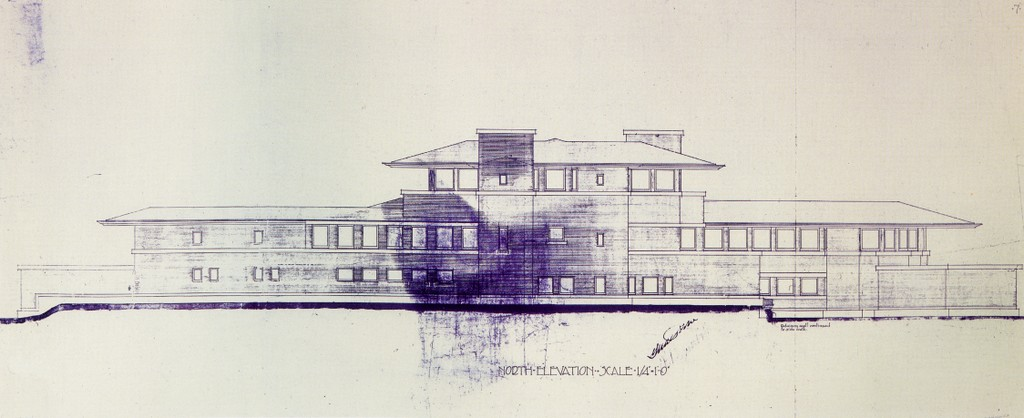
North elevation of the Robie House, from the Frank Lloyd Wright archives

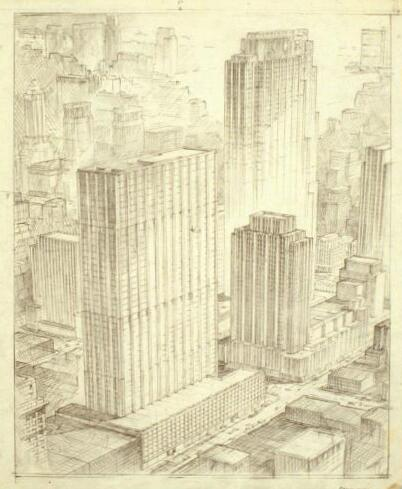
Bird's-eye view of Rockefeller Center, from the Hugh Ferriss architectural drawings and papers

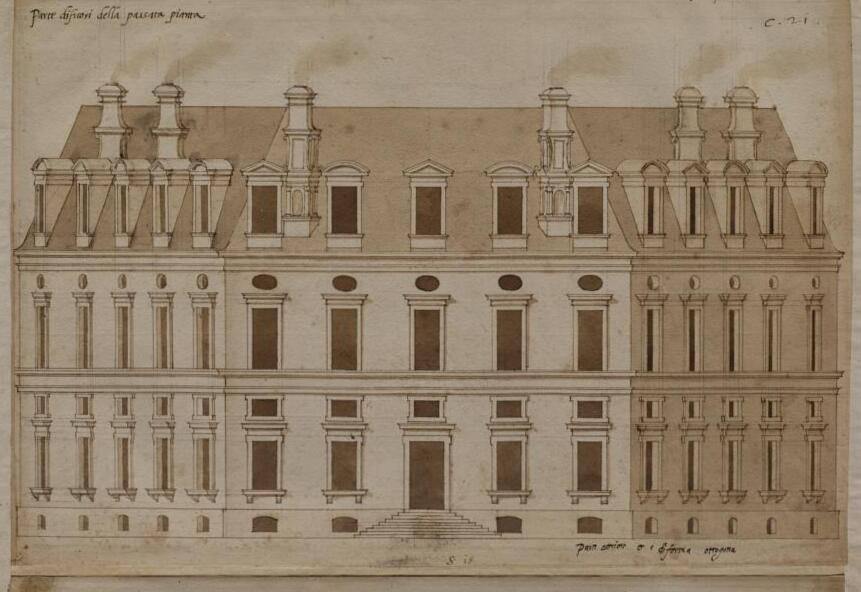
Illustration from book six of Tutte l'opere d'architettura et prospetiva, Sebastiano Serlio, c. 1550

Avery's Drawings & Archives department is among the largest and most significant architectural archives in the world. Its holdings include more than two million architectural drawings, photographs, manuscripts, business records, audio-visual recordings, and other related materials, primarily documenting the architectural history New York City and the surrounding region, with significant and wide-ranging examples of American and international architecture relating to the work of New York-based architects and alumni of Columbia's School of Architecture.

Among the notable architects and designers represented in the collection are:

- Max Abramovitz
- Oscar Bluemner
- Gordon Bunshaft
- Walker O. Cain
- Félix Candela
- Carrère and Hastings
- Giorgio Cavaglieri
- Serge Chermayeff
- Ogden Codman Jr.
- Harvey Wiley Corbett
- Le Corbusier
- Ralph Adams Cram
- Alexander Jackson Davis
- Delano & Aldrich
- Leopold Eidlitz
- Wilson Eyre
- Abe Feder
- Fellheimer & Wagner
- Ernest Flagg
- Hugh Ferriss
- Greene and Greene
- Walter Burley Griffin and Marion Mahony Griffin
- Bertram Grosvenor Goodhue
- Percival Goodman
- Ferdinand Gottlieb
- Hector Guimard
- Charles Coolidge Haight
- Wallace K. Harrison
- Herts & Tallant
- Raymond Hood
- Norman Jaffe
- John MacLane Johansen
- Philip Johnson
- Ely Jacques Kahn
- Charles R. Lamb
- Thomas W. Lamb
- Morris Lapidus
- Lee Lawrie
- Detlef Lienau
- Harold Van Buren Magonigle
- McKim, Mead, and White
- John J. McNamara
- Ludwig Mies van der Rohe
- Mayers, Murray & Phillip
- Hermann Muthesius
- Paul Nelson
- Richard Neutra
- Carl Pfeiffer
- Charles A. Platt
- John Russell Pope
- James Renwick Jr.
- James Gamble Rogers
- Emery Roth/Emery Roth & Sons
- John Calvin Stevens
- Gustav Stickley
- Russell Sturgis
- Louis Sullivan
- Edgar Tafel
- Martin E. Thompson
- Bernard Tschumi
- Richard Upjohn
- Isaac Ware
- Warren & Wetmore
- Stanford White
- Frederick Clarke Withers
- Shadrach Woods
- Frank Lloyd Wright
- York and Sawyer

The Archives also holds the records of the Empire State Building, Guastavino Fireproof Construction Company, the New York Architectural Terra-Cotta Company, and Woodlawn Cemetery in the Bronx, New York, as well as papers of artist and writer Kenyon Cox, journalist Douglas Haskell, who was editor of Architectural Forum, and drawings by mural and stained glass artist John LaFarge. The department also has major archives of architectural photography, including works by C. D. Arnold, George Cserna, Samuel H. Gottscho, and Joseph W. Molitor. Lastly, the department holds Antonio Lafreri’s "Speculum Romanae Magnificentiae".

== Avery Index ==
Avery Library is also home to the Avery Index to Architectural Periodicals. Begun at Avery in 1934 by Talbot Hamlin, the Index provides citations to articles in approximately 300 current and over 1,000 retrospective architectural and related periodicals, with primary emphasis on architectural design and history as well as archaeology, landscape architecture, interior design, decorative arts, garden history, historic preservation, urban planning and design, real estate development, and environmental studies. The Index also includes a large body of obituaries of architects. Until July 1, 2009, the Getty Information Institute and later GRI co-produced the index. On that date, GRI transferred the database back to Columbia University, which continues to maintain it.
