= Robert L. Ramsay (academic) =

Robert Lee Ramsay (December 14, 1880 – December 14, 1953) was a professor of English at the University of Missouri from 1907 to 1952. Starting in the mid-1920s, Ramsay started to develop a dictionary of Missouri placenames, creating a methodology and overseeing graduate research on the topic. Due to widespread availability of the book, Our Storehouse of Missouri Place Names, Ramsay is the best known authority of the subject in Missouri. His research is used for official citations by the United States Board on Geographic Names. Ramsay was a founding member of the American Name Society.
