= Michael Ramsey (disambiguation) =

Michael Ramsey (1904–1988) was an English Anglican bishop and peer.

Michael or Mike Ramsey may also refer to:

- Michael D. Ramsey, American legal scholar
- Mike Ramsey (ice hockey) (born 1960), American ice hockey defenseman
- Mike Ramsey (infielder) (born 1954), Major League Baseball infielder
- Mike Ramsey (outfielder) (born 1960), Major League Baseball outfielder

== See also ==
- Mike Ramsay (disambiguation)
