= Bob Ramsey (footballer, born 1935) =

English footballer

Personal information
- Full name: Robert Ramsey
- Date of birth: 24 February 1935 (age 91)
- Place of birth: Sunderland, Tyne and Wear, England
- Height: 5 ft 10 1/2 in (1.79 m)
- Position: Full back

Senior career*
Years	Team	Apps	(Gls)
1953–1958	Huddersfield Town	0	(0)
1958–1961	York City	75	(0)
Total		75	(0)
- * Club domestic league appearances and goals

Robert Ramsey (born 24 February 1935) is an English former professional footballer who played as a full back in the Football League for York City and was on the books of Huddersfield Town without making a league appearance.
