= Allan Ramsay =

Allan Ramsay may refer to:

- Allan Ramsay (poet) or Allan Ramsay the Elder (1686–1758), Scottish poet
- Allan Ramsay (artist) or Allan Ramsay the Younger (1713–1784), Scottish portrait painter
- Allan Ramsay (diplomat) (1937–2022), British diplomat
- Allan M. Ramsay (born 1953), professor of computer science
- Allan Ramsay (portrait painter, born 1959), Scottish painter

== See also ==
- Alan Ramsay (1895–1973), Australian army general
- Alan Ramsey (1938–2020), Australian newspaper reporter and commentator
- Willis Alan Ramsey (born 1951), American singer/songwriter
