= William Ramsay (disambiguation) =

William Ramsay (1852–1916) was a Scottish chemist who discovered the noble gases.

William Ramsay may also refer to:

- William Ramsay (astrologer) (fl. 1660), English physician and astrologer
- William Maule, 1st Baron Panmure (1771–1852), Scottish peer (until 1782 named the Hon. William Ramsay)
- Bill Ramsay (born 1929), American jazz saxophonist and band leader based in Seattle
- Bill Ramsay (politician) (born 1962), politician in Newfoundland, Canada
- Bill Ramsay (athlete) (1928–1988), Australian athlete
- William Ramsay (classical scholar) (1806–1865), professor of humanity in the University of Glasgow 1831–63
- William Ramsay (MP) (1809–1850), Scottish MP for Midlothian and Stirlingshire
- William Mitchell Ramsay (1851–1939), Scottish archaeologist and New Testament scholar
- William Ramsay (manufacturer) (1868–1914), Australian manufacturer who invented Kiwi shoe polish
- William Ramsay, 1st Earl of Dalhousie (died 1672), Scottish nobleman, army officer and politician
- William Norman Ramsay (1782–1815), Scottish cavalry officer in the British Army, killed in action at Waterloo
- William Ramsay (Royal Navy officer) (1796–1871), Scottish admiral in the Royal Navy

== See also ==
- Sir William Ramsay School, school in Hazlemere, Buckinghamshire, named after the chemist
- William Ramsey (disambiguation)
- Wilhelm Ramsay, geologist
