= Gordon Ramsay (footballer) =

Australian rules footballer (1929–2011)

Personal information
- Full name: Gordon Ramsay
- Born: 22 March 1929
- Died: 30 March 2011 (aged 82)
- Original team: East Hawthorn
- Height: 180 cm (5 ft 11 in)
- Weight: 83 kg (183 lb)

Playing career^{1}
| Years | Club | Games (Goals) |
| 1947–49 | St Kilda | 13 (0) |
| 1950–52 | Port Melbourne (VFA) | 48 (18) |
| 1953 | Sandringham (VFA) | 6 (0) |
- ^{1} Playing statistics correct to the end of 1953.

Gordon Robert Ramsay (22 March 1929 – 30 March 2011) was an Australian rules footballer who played with St Kilda in the Victorian Football League (VFL).
