= Andrew Ramsay (geologist) =

Scottish geologist

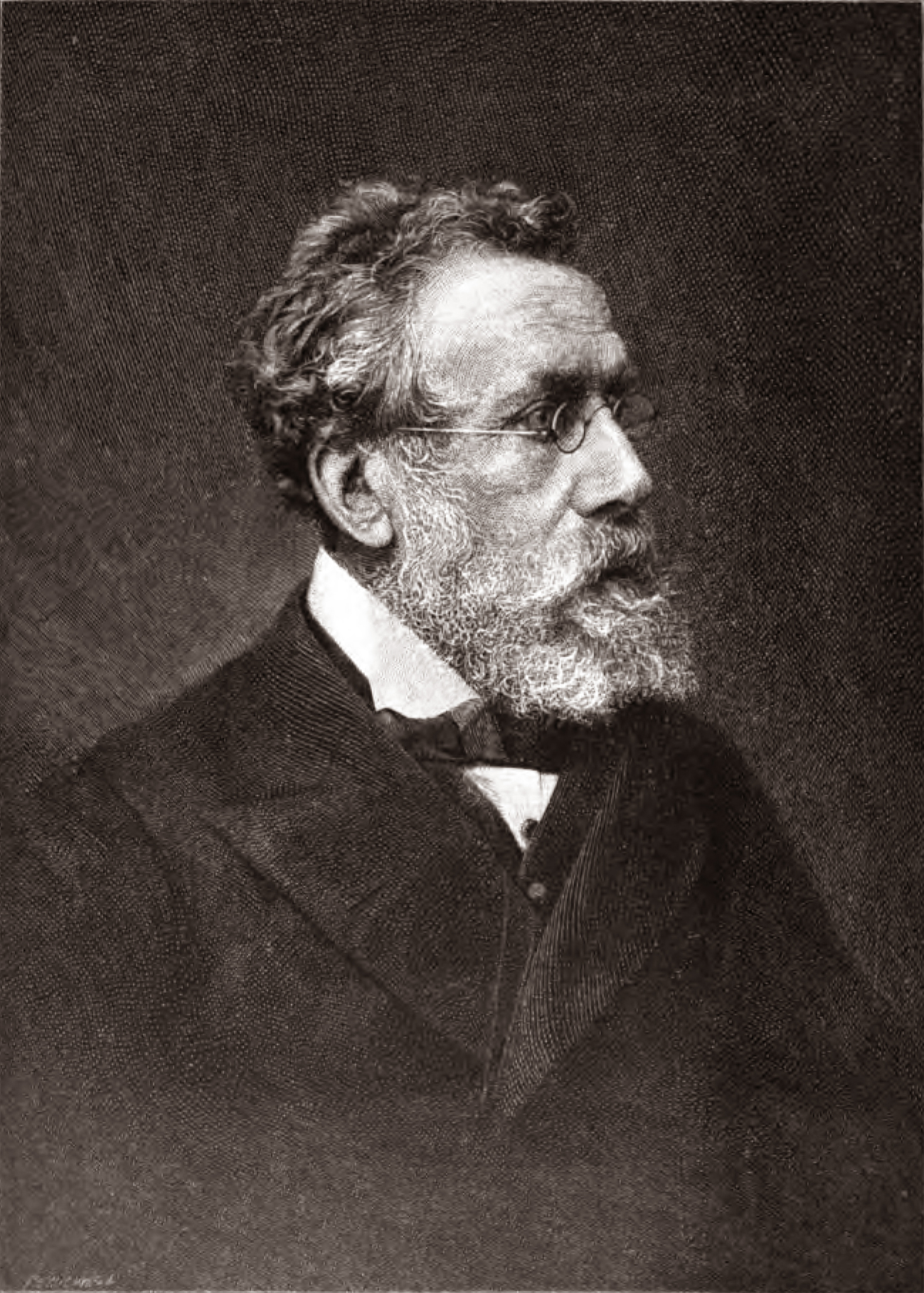
- Born: 31 January 1814; Glasgow
- Died: 9 December 1891 (aged 77); Beaumaris, Wales
- Awards: Wollaston Medal (1871); Royal Medal (1879)

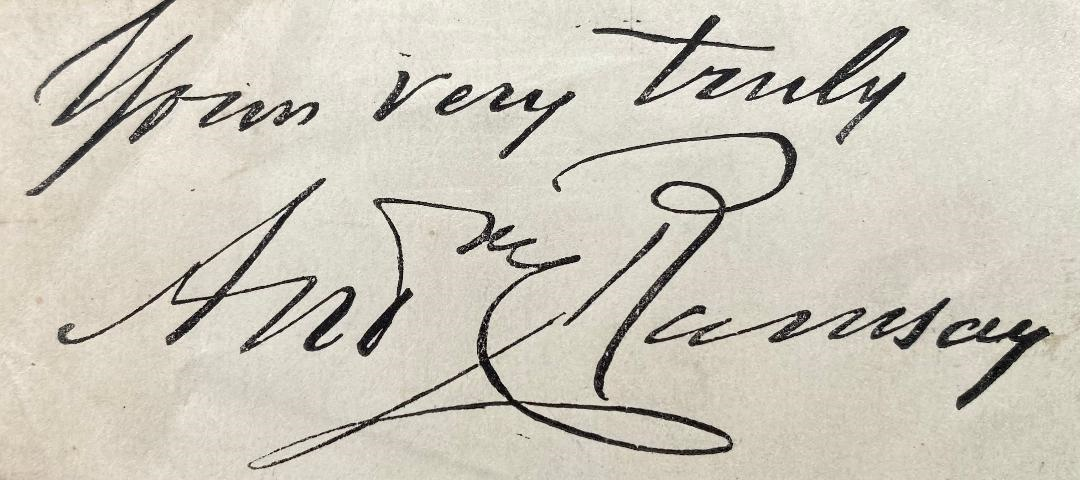
Sir Andrew Crombie Ramsay - signature.

Sir Andrew Crombie Ramsay (sometimes spelt Ramsey) (31 January 1814 – 9 December 1891) was a Scottish geologist.

== Biography ==
Ramsay was born at Glasgow. He started working in a textile business in the city's Candleriggs, but from spending his holidays in Arran he became interested in the study of the rocks of that island, and was thus led to acquire the rudiments of geology. A 3D papier mache geological model of Arran, made by him on the scale of two inches to the mile, was exhibited at the meeting of the British Association at Glasgow in 1840, and attracted the notice of Roderick Murchison, with the result that he received, from Sir Henry De la Beche, an appointment on the Geological Survey, on which he served for forty years, from 1841 to 1881.

He was first stationed at Tenby, and to that circumstance may be attributed the fact that so much of his geological work dealt with Wales. His first book, The Geology of the Isle of Arran, was published in 1841. In 1845 he became local director for Great Britain, but he continued to carry on a certain amount of field-work until 1854. To the first volume of the Memoirs of the Geological Survey (1846) he contributed a now classic essay, On the Denudation of South Wales and the Adjacent Counties of England, in which he advocated the power of the sea to form great plains of denudation, although at the time he underestimated the influence of subaerial agents in sculpturing the scenery. In 1866 he published The Geology of North Wales (vol. iii. of the Memoirs), assisted by John William Salter who contributed the palaeontological portion to this work and of which a second edition was published in 1881.

He was elected as a member to the American Philosophical Society in 1862.

He was chosen as a professor of geology at University College, London, in 1848, and afterwards as a lecturer in the same subject at the Royal School of Mines in 1851. Eleven years later he was elected to the presidential chair of the Geological Society of London, and in 1872, he succeeded Murchison as director-general of the Geological Survey. In 1880 he acted as president of the British Association at Swansea, and in the following year retired from the public service, receiving at the same time the honour of knighthood. In 1860, he published a book entitled The Old Glaciers of Switzerland and North Wales. The study of this subject led him to discuss the Glacial Origin of Certain Lakes in Switzerland, the Black Forest, &c. He dealt also with the origin of The Red Rocks of England (1871) and The River Courses of England and Wales (1872).

He was especially interested in tracing out the causes which have determined the physical configuration of a district, and he devoted much attention to the effects produced by ice, his name being identified with the hypothesis, which, however, has never commanded general assent, that in some cases lake basins have been scooped out by glaciers. A master in the broader questions of stratigraphy and physical geology, he was a deal exponent of facts, but rather impatient of details, while his original and often bold theories, expressed both in lectures and in writings, stirred others with enthusiasm and undoubtedly exercised great influence on the progress of geology.

His lectures to working men, given in 1863 in the Museum of Practical Geology, formed the nucleus of his Physical Geology and Geography of Great Britain (5th ed., 1878; 6th ed., by H. B. Woodward, 1894). He received a Royal medal in 1880 from the Royal Society, of which he became a fellow in 1862; he was also the recipient of the Neil prize of the Royal Society of Edinburgh in 1866, of the Wollaston medal of the Geological Society of London in 1871, and was elected to honorary membership of the Manchester Literary and Philosophical Society, in 1886. He died at Beaumaris in Anglesey and is buried at St Sadwrn's church in Llansadwrn where his grave is marked by a glacial erratic boulder.

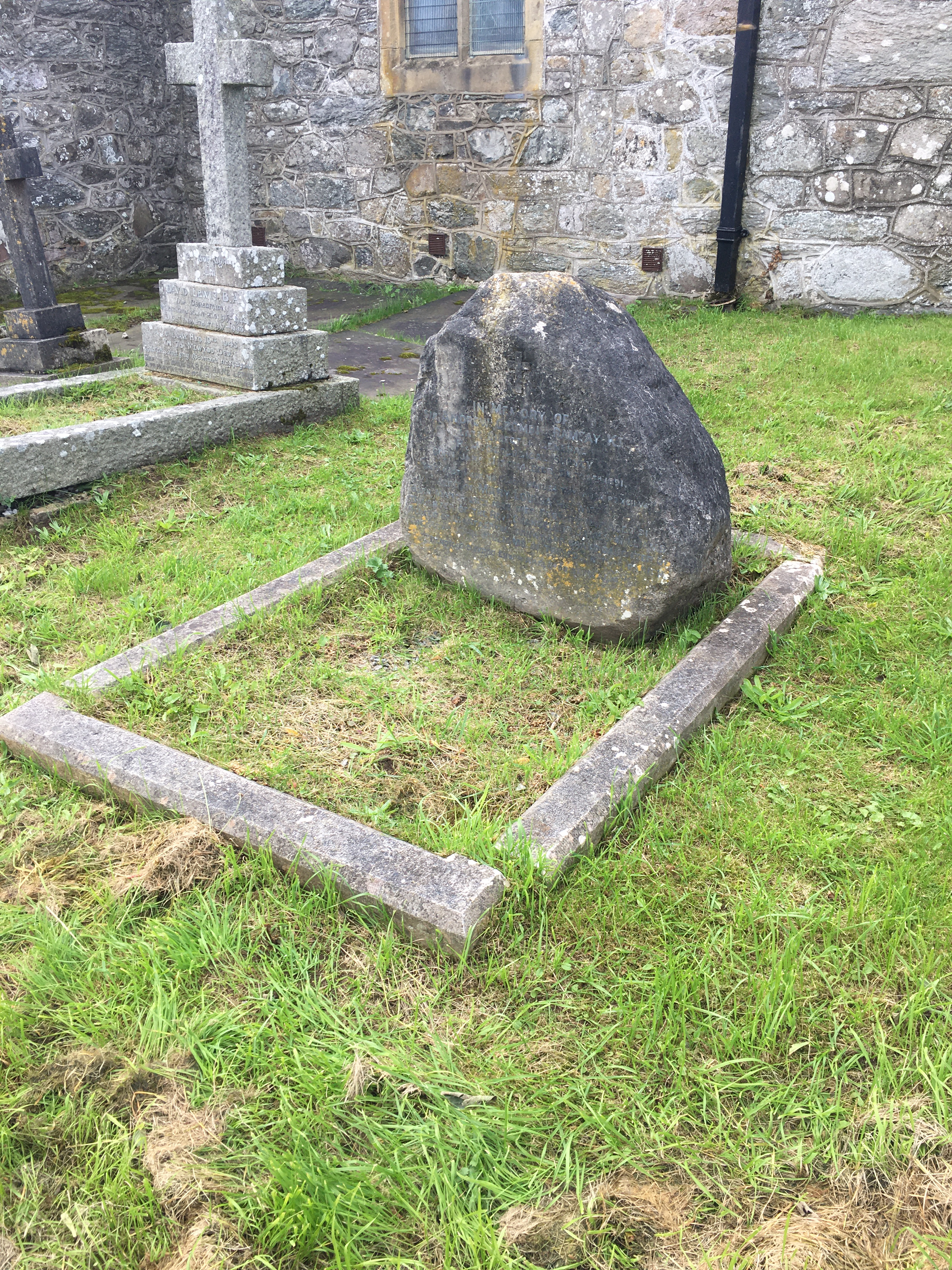
Sir A.C. Ramsay's erratic boulder headstone in the graveyard at Sadwrn's Church, Llansadwrn, Anglesey.

== See also ==
Clan Ramsay
