= Mary Ramsey (philanthropist) =

English philanthropist

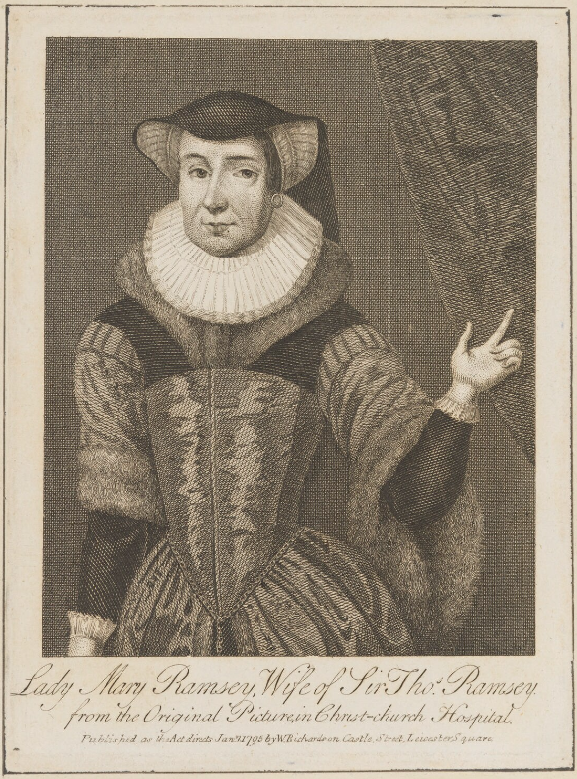
1795 line engraving, possibly by T. Trotter, after a painting in Christ's Hospital (Note: The original painting shows Ramsey's right hand on a book, possibly showing appreciation for reading, but coupled with the upwards pointing gesture made with her other hand the book may be a Prayer book and the image an expression of her piety. Which ever is the case, placed within a hospital that was devoted to educating orphans and destitute children, it can be read as showing her commitment to supporting learning.)

Lady Mary Ramsey (née Dale; also known as Mary Avery; died 1601) was an English philanthropist. She married the Lord Mayor of London Thomas Ramsey.

== Biography ==
Mary Dale was born to Bristol merchant and sheriff William Dale, with little being known about her early life. She married the pensioner Thomas Avery, formally in the service of Thomas Cromwell, in 1554. Upon his death Mary would swiftly remarry to the Lord Mayor of London Thomas Ramsey, one of the wealthiest men in Elizabethan London.

The couple would undertake a wide range of philanthropic works, in the end totalling some £14,318, mostly around London. The most widely remembered of these projects were there endowments to Christ's Hospital in London and Queen Elizabeth's Hospital in Bristol, in 1583. After Thomas' death in 1590 Mary would continue the charitable effort, conveying her manor at Colne Engaine to Christ's Hospital and supporting them by endowing a set of scholarships at the collage. She also undertook a variety of other charitable endeavors including the foundation of Essex grammar schools, the parish aid in London, funding several City companies (including the borough of Bristol) and funds for the relief of wounded soldiers, debtors and destitute university students.

Ramsey died in November of 1601 and was buried at Christ Church. Her will made several large charitable bequeathments. In an epitaph written after her death she was described as, "A Lady rare, most vertuous, meeke, and milde". Thomas Haywood would portray a fictionalised version of Mary and Thomas Ramsey in his 1605 history play If You Know Not Me, You Know Nobody, Part I.
