= Charles Maule Ramsay =

British army officer and politician

Lieutenant-Colonel the Honourable Charles Maule Ramsay (27 January 1859 – 7 April 1936) was a British army officer and briefly a Liberal Unionist Member of Parliament (MP).

== Personal life ==
He was the youngest son of the 12th Earl of Dalhousie, an admiral in the Royal Navy, and his wife Sarah née Roberts. He obtained a commission as an officer in the Royal Artillery, but retired from the army at a young age.

He moved to the United States where he took up ranching, and married in 1885 Martha Estelle Garrison, of New York, granddaughter of C. K. Garrison. He later unsuccessfully took part in the Klondike Gold Rush in the Yukon Territory.

He returned to Scotland where he became an officer in the Forfar and Kincardine Artillery Militia, rising to be its Lieutenant-Colonel Commandant in 1906. He was a major landlord in the area having inherited a large estate in Forfarshire. In 1894, he was chosen as Liberal Unionist candidate to contest a parliamentary by-election in Forfarshire in November 1894. The vacancy was caused when the sitting Liberal MP, Sir John Rigby was appointed a Lord Justice of Appeal. The Liberals had chosen a London-based stockbroker as their candidate in preference to a local businessman, Martin White, a decision that led to many voters switching their allegiance to Ramsay, who gained the seat. He held the seat for only a few months, as he was defeated by White at the subsequent general election in 1895. He contested the seat in the following 1897 by-election and 1900 general election, but lost to the Liberal party candidate John Sinclair both times.

With the outbreak of the First World War Ramsay returned to active service. Following the ending of the conflict he devoted himself to voluntary work supporting the Navy, Army and Air Force Institutes.

C M Ramsay had no children, and became a widower in 1904. He died in London in April 1936 aged 77.

Parliament of the United Kingdom
Preceded by Sir John Rigby	Member of Parliament for Forfarshire; 1894 – 1895	Succeeded by Martin White
