= 1909 Forfarshire by-election =

UK Parliamentary by-election

The 1909 Forfarshire by-election was held on 27 February 1909. The by-election was held due to the elevation to the peerage of the incumbent Liberal MP, John Sinclair who became Baron Pentland. It was won by the Liberal candidate James Falconer.

James Falconer

1909 Forfarshire by-election
Party	Candidate	Votes	%	±%
Liberal	James Falconer	6,422	61.8	−5.7
Conservative	Robert Leslie Blackburn	3,970	38.2	+5.7
Majority		2,452	23.6	−11.4
Turnout		10,392	81.3	+1.6
Liberal hold		Swing	-5.7	
