= 1894 Forfarshire by-election =

UK parliamentary by-election

The 1894 Forfarshire by-election was a parliamentary by-election held for the British House of Commons constituency of Forfarshire, Scotland, on 17 November 1894. The result was a gain by the Liberal Unionists from the Liberal Party.

== Background ==
Traditionally, Forfarshire had elected Liberals to the Commons, but in 1886 the sitting MP J. W. Barclay had defected to the Liberal Unionist Party. John Rigby, previously member for Wisbech in Cambridgeshire, England, was chosen by the Liberals as their candidate at the 1892 general election. Although a stranger to Scottish politics, Rigby won the seat in the Liberal interest by a majority of 866 votes. Following his appointment as Attorney General for England and Wales, he was obliged to seek re-election, and was returned unopposed in August 1892.

The seat became vacant when Rigby was appointed a Lord Justice of Appeal on 19 October 1894.

== The campaign and candidates ==
The electorate of the constituency was approximately 12,000. The towns of the county were very diverse socially: the burghs of Broughty Ferry, Carnoustie and Monifieth were largely suburbs of the City of Dundee. They contained large numbers of wealthy manufacturers and merchants, as well as working class voters engaged in the fishing, chemical, boot-making and textile industries. Kirriemuir, at the north of the constituency, was regarded as Radical: in the past Chartism had been strong among the weavers of the town. In the east were fishing villages.

In the rural parts of the county the farmers were considered to be almost exclusively Unionist voters. The most important voting bloc, numbering about 3,000, were the farm servants. They were regarded as being "singularly shrewd, well-informed and independent politicians".

The Liberals chose Henry Robson to defend the seat. Robson, although Scottish born, had made his living as a stockbroker in London. The choice of the "stranger", Robson, rather than the popular Dundee merchant, Martin White, was resented locally. The Unionists, by contrast, chose a local landowner, the Honorable Charles Maule Ramsay. Ramsay was the younger brother of the late Earl of Dalhousie, who had sat as a Liberal MP for Liverpool.

As the campaign went on, it became clear that the votes of the agricultural labourers would prove crucial. Sir John Rigby had proved popular with them as he promised to campaign for a half-holiday a week for ploughmen. However, he had not lived up to their expectations, instead concerning himself with the Home Rule question at Westminster. When he vacated his seat to take up a judicial appointment he was accused of neglecting his constituents, and simply using his parliamentary seat as a stepping stone in his career. This perceived slight, and the imposition of an outside candidate saw a big swing in the agricultural vote towards Ramsay.

== Result ==
Ramsay was elected by a majority of 288 votes. The size of the majority was unexpected and caused jubilation among the Unionists and despair among the Liberals. It was felt that where the Unionists had been highly organised, the Liberals had been lax in their campaigning.

Forfarshire by-election, 17 November 1894
| Party | Candidate | Votes | % | ±% |
|---|---|---|---|---|
| Liberal Unionist | Hon. Charles Maule Ramsay | 5,145 | 51.4 | +6.2 |
| Liberal | Henry Robson | 4,857 | 48.6 | −6.2 |
| Majority | | 288 | 2.8 | N/A |
| Turnout | | 10,002 | 83.3 | +3.5 |
| Liberal Unionist gain from Liberal | | | | |

The Unionist victory was short-lived, however. At the general election held in the following year, the Liberals learned from their mistakes. The preferred local candidate, Martin White, was this time selected, and the seat regained by the party.
