= Lord Blackburn =

Lord Blackburn may refer to

- Colin Blackburn, Baron Blackburn (1813–1896) British lawyer and judge; life peer from 10 October 1876, by the title of Baron Blackburn, of Killearn in the County of Stirlingshire
- Robert Blackburn, Lord Blackburn, (1864–1944) Scottish lawyer and judge; judicial title Lord Blackburn as a Senator of the College of Justice from 1918 to 1935

== See also ==
- John Morley, 1st Viscount Morley of Blackburn (1838–1923); hereditary peer from 1908, by the title of Viscount Morley of Blackburn, in the County Palatine of Lancaster
- Adam Patel, Baron Patel of Blackburn (1940-2019); British businessman and Labour life peer from 14 February 2000, by the title of Baron Patel of Blackburn, of Langho in the County of Lancashire
