= Forfarshire (UK Parliament constituency) =

Parliamentary constituency in the United Kingdom, 1801–1950

- Former county constituency for the House of Commons
- Subdivision: Forfarshire

1708–1950
- Seats: One
- Created from: Forfarshire
- Replaced by: North Angus & Mearns; South Angus

Forfarshire was a Scottish county constituency represented in the House of Commons of Great Britain from 1708 until 1800, and then in the House of Commons of the United Kingdom from 1801 until 1950.

It elected one Member of Parliament (MP) using the first-past-the-post voting system.

== Creation ==
The British parliamentary constituency was created in 1708 following the Acts of Union, 1707 and replaced the former Parliament of Scotland shire constituency of Forfarshire.

== Boundaries ==
The Representation of the People Act 1918 defined the constituency as consisting of the county of Forfar, except the county of the city of Dundee and the burghs of Montrose, Arbroath, Brechin, and Forfar. The four excepted burghs formed part of the Montrose District of Burghs.

The county of Forfarshire was renamed Angus in 1928. However, no change was made in the name of the constituency prior to its abolition.

== History ==
The constituency elected one Member of Parliament (MP) by the first-past-the-post system until the seat was abolished for the 1950 general election.

The constituency was abolished under the Representation of the People Act 1948, which reorganised parliamentary boundaries throughout the United Kingdom. The seat was divided between North Angus and Mearns (which also included Kincardineshire) and South Angus.

== Members of Parliament ==
Election	Member	Party
1708	John Carnegie (expelled)	
1716 by-election	James Scott	
1733 by-election	Robert Scott	
1734	Thomas Lyon, later Earl of Strathmore	
1735 by-election	William Maule, Earl Panmure (from 1743)	
1782 by-election	Archibald Douglas	Tory
1790	David Scott	
1796 by-election	William Maule, later Baron Panmure	
1796	Sir David Carnegie	
1805 by-election	William Maule, later Baron Panmure	Whig
1831 by-election	Donald Ogilvy (Unseated on petition Jan 1832)	Whig
January 1832	Lord Douglas Gordon-Hallyburton	Whig
1841	Lord Frederick Gordon-Hallyburton	Whig
1852	Lauderdale Maule	Whig
1854 by-election	Adam Duncan, Viscount Duncan, later Earl of Camperdown	Whig
1859	Adam Duncan, Viscount Duncan, later Earl of Camperdown	Liberal
1860 by-election	Charles Carnegie	Liberal
1872 by-election	James William Barclay	Liberal
1886	James William Barclay	Liberal Unionist
1892	Sir John Rigby, QC	Liberal
1894	Charles Maule Ramsay Conservative	Liberal Unionist
1895	Martin White	Liberal
1897 by-election	John Sinclair, later Baron Pentland	Liberal
1909 by-election	James Falconer	Liberal
1918	William T. Shaw	Unionist
1922	James Falconer	Liberal
1924	Sir Harry Hope	Unionist
1931	William T. Shaw	Unionist
1945	Simon Ramsay, later Earl of Dalhousie	Unionist
1950	constituency abolished	

== Election results ==
=== Elections in the 1830s ===
General election 1830: Forfarshire
Party	Candidate	Votes	%
Whig	William Maule	Unopposed	
Registered electors		124	
Whig hold			

General election 1831: Forfarshire
Party	Candidate	Votes	%
Whig	William Maule	Unopposed	
Registered electors		124	
Whig hold			

Maule was elevated to the peerage, becoming 1st Baron Panmure and causing a by-election.

By-election, 3 October 1831: Forfarshire
Party	Candidate	Votes	%
Whig	Donald Ogilvy	46	51.1
Whig	Douglas Gordon-Hallyburton	44	48.9
Majority		2	2.2
Turnout		90	72.6
Registered electors		124	
Whig hold			

- On petition, Ogilvy was unseated in favour of Gordon-Hallyburton

General election 1832: Forfarshire
Party	Candidate	Votes	%
Whig	Douglas Gordon-Hallyburton	Unopposed	
Registered electors		1,241	
Whig hold			

General election 1835: Forfarshire
Party	Candidate	Votes	%
Whig	Douglas Gordon-Hallyburton	625	58.4
Conservative	John Stuart-Wortley	446	41.6
Majority		179	16.8
Turnout		1,071	75.4
Registered electors		1,421	
Whig hold			

General election 1837: Forfarshire
Party	Candidate	Votes	%
Whig	Douglas Gordon-Hallyburton	Unopposed	
Registered electors		1,790	
Whig hold			

=== Elections in the 1840s ===
General election 1841: Forfarshire
Party	Candidate	Votes	%	±%
Whig	Frederick Gordon	Unopposed		
Registered electors		1,979		
Whig hold				

General election 1847: Forfarshire
Party	Candidate	Votes	%	±%
Whig	Frederick Gordon-Hallyburton	Unopposed		
Registered electors		2,540		
Whig hold				

=== Elections in the 1850s ===
General election 1852: Forfarshire
Party	Candidate	Votes	%	±%
Whig	Lauderdale Maule	Unopposed		
Registered electors		2,873		
Whig hold				

Maule was appointed Surveyor-General of the Ordnance, requiring a by-election.

By-election, 25 February 1853: Forfarshire
Party	Candidate	Votes	%	±%
Whig	Lauderdale Maule	Unopposed		
Whig hold				

Maule's death caused a by-election.

By-election, 11 October 1854: Forfarshire
Party	Candidate	Votes	%	±%
Whig	Adam Haldane-Duncan	Unopposed		
Whig hold				

Haldane-Duncan was appointed a Lord Commissioner of the Treasury, requiring a by-election.

By-election, 10 March 1855: Forfarshire
Party	Candidate	Votes	%	±%
Whig	Adam Haldane-Duncan	Unopposed		
Whig hold				

General election 1857: Forfarshire
Party	Candidate	Votes	%	±%
Whig	Adam Haldane-Duncan	Unopposed		
Registered electors		3,288		
Whig hold				

General election 1859: Forfarshire
Party	Candidate	Votes	%	±%
Liberal	Adam Haldane-Duncan	Unopposed		
Registered electors		3,421		
Liberal hold				

=== Elections in the 1860s ===
Haldane-Duncan succeeded to the peerage, becoming Earl of Camperdown, and causing a by-election.

By-election, 1 February 1860: Forfarshire
Party	Candidate	Votes	%	±%
Liberal	Charles Carnegie	Unopposed		
Liberal hold				

General election 1865: Forfarshire
Party	Candidate	Votes	%	±%
Liberal	Charles Carnegie	Unopposed		
Registered electors		2,108		
Liberal hold				

General election 1868: Forfarshire
Party	Candidate	Votes	%	±%
Liberal	Charles Carnegie	Unopposed		
Registered electors		3,379		
Liberal hold				

=== Elections in the 1870s ===
Carnegie resigned after being appointed Inspector of Constabulary for Scotland.

By-election, 16 Dec 1872: Forfarshire
Party	Candidate	Votes	%	±%
Liberal	James William Barclay	1,481	56.8	N/A
Conservative	James Ramsay	1,128	43.2	New
Majority		353	13.6	N/A
Turnout		2,609	72.4	N/A
Registered electors		3,603		
Liberal hold				

General election 1874: Forfarshire
Party	Candidate	Votes	%	±%
Liberal	James William Barclay	Unopposed		
Registered electors		3,619		
Liberal hold				

=== Elections in the 1880s ===
General election 1880: Forfarshire
Party	Candidate	Votes	%	±%
Liberal	James William Barclay	Unopposed		
Registered electors		3,634		
Liberal hold				

General election 1885: Forfarshire
Party	Candidate	Votes	%	±%
Liberal	James William Barclay	6,157	76.9	N/A
Conservative	William Alexander Lindsay	1,851	23.1	New
Majority		4,306	53.8	N/A
Turnout		8,008	71.3	N/A
Registered electors		11,232		
Liberal hold		Swing	N/A	

General election 1886: Forfarshire
Party	Candidate	Votes	%	±%
Liberal Unionist	James William Barclay	3,839	52.8	+29.7
Liberal	David Charles Guthrie	3,432	47.2	−29.7
Majority		407	5.6	N/A
Turnout		7,271	64.7	−6.6
Registered electors		11,232		
Liberal Unionist gain from Liberal		Swing	+29.7	

=== Elections in the 1890s ===
General election 1892: Forfarshire
Party	Candidate	Votes	%	±%
Liberal	John Rigby	4,943	54.8	+7.6
Liberal Unionist	James William Barclay	4,077	45.2	−7.6
Majority		866	9.6	N/A
Turnout		9,020	79.8	+15.1
Registered electors		11,307		
Liberal gain from Liberal Unionist		Swing	+7.6	

Rigby is appointed Solicitor General for England and Wales, requiring a by-election.

By-election, 1892: Forfarshire
Party	Candidate	Votes	%	±%
Liberal	John Rigby	Unopposed		
Liberal hold				

Rigby resigns after being appointed a Lord Justice of Appeal, triggering a by-election.

1894 Forfarshire by-election
Party	Candidate	Votes	%	±%
Conservative	Charles Maule Ramsay	5,145	51.4	+6.2
Liberal	Henry Robson	4,859	48.6	−6.2
Majority		286	2.8	N/A
Turnout		10,004	83.3	+3.5
Registered electors		12,010		
Conservative gain from Liberal		Swing	+6.2	

General election 1895: Forfarshire
Party	Candidate	Votes	%	±%
Liberal	Martin White	5,159	52.2	−2.6
Conservative	Charles Maule Ramsay	4,718	47.8	+2.6
Majority		441	4.4	−5.2
Turnout		9,877	82.2	+2.4
Registered electors		12,010		
Liberal hold		Swing	−2.6	

White resigns, triggering a by-election.

Sinclair

1897 Forfarshire by-election
Party	Candidate	Votes	%	±%
Liberal	John Sinclair	5,423	52.2	0.0
Conservative	Charles Maule Ramsay	4,965	47.8	0.0
Majority		458	4.4	0.0
Turnout		10,388	85.1	+2.9
Registered electors		12,200		
Liberal hold		Swing	0.0	

=== Elections in the 1900s ===
General election 1900: Forfarshire
Party	Candidate	Votes	%	±%
Liberal	John Sinclair	4,962	51.3	−0.9
Conservative	Charles Maule Ramsay	4,714	48.7	+0.9
Majority		248	2.6	−1.8
Turnout		9,676	78.6	−3.6
Registered electors		12,313		
Liberal hold		Swing	−0.9	

General election 1906: Forfarshire
Party	Candidate	Votes	%	±%
Liberal	John Sinclair	6,796	67.5	+16.2
Liberal Unionist	J. Mackay Bernard	3,277	32.5	−16.2
Majority		3,519	35.0	+32.4
Turnout		10,073	79.7	+1.1
Registered electors		12,644		
Liberal hold		Swing	+16.2	

Falconer

Forfarshire by-election, 1909
Party	Candidate	Votes	%	±%
Liberal	James Falconer	6,422	61.8	−5.7
Conservative	Robert Blackburn	3,970	38.2	+5.7
Majority		2,452	23.6	−11.4
Turnout		10,392	81.3	+1.6
Registered electors		12,778		
Liberal hold		Swing	−5.7	

=== Elections in the 1910s ===
General election January 1910: Forfarshire
Party	Candidate	Votes	%	±%
Liberal	James Falconer	6,789	61.3	−6.2
Conservative	Robert Blackburn	4,284	38.7	+6.2
Majority		2,505	22.6	−12.4
Turnout		11,073		
Liberal hold		Swing	-0.5	

General election December 1910: Forfarshire
Party	Candidate	Votes	%	±%
Liberal	James Falconer	6,449	59.5	−1.8
Conservative	James B Duncan	4,397	40.5	+1.8
Majority		2,052	19.0	−3.6
Turnout		10,846		
Liberal hold		Swing	-1.8	

General election 1918: Forfarshire
Party	Candidate	Votes	%	±%
Unionist	William T. Shaw	5,697	52.4	+11.9
Liberal	James Falconer	5,179	47.6	−11.9
Majority		518	4.8	N/A
Turnout		10,876	44.2	
Registered electors		24,611		
Unionist gain from Liberal		Swing	+11.9	

=== Elections in the 1920s ===
General election 1922: Forfarshire
Party	Candidate	Votes	%	±%
Liberal	James Falconer	8,567	54.8	+7.2
Unionist	William T. Shaw	7,071	45.2	−7.2
Majority		1,496	9.6	N/A
Turnout		15,638	65.0	+20.8
Registered electors		24,040		
Liberal gain from Unionist		Swing	+7.2	

General election 1923: Forfarshire
Party	Candidate	Votes	%	±%
Liberal	James Falconer	7,605	52.9	−1.9
Unionist	William T. Shaw	6,758	47.1	+1.9
Majority		847	5.8	−3.8
Turnout		14,363	60.3	−4.7
Registered electors		23,828		
Liberal hold		Swing	−1.9	

General election 1924: Forfarshire
Party	Candidate	Votes	%	±%
Unionist	Harry Hope	8,022	49.1	+2.0
Liberal	James Falconer	4,581	28.0	−24.9
Labour	Charles Gallie	3,736	22.9	New
Majority		3,441	21.1	N/A
Turnout		16,339	68.3	+8.0
Registered electors		23,916		
Unionist gain from Liberal		Swing	+13.5	

General election 1929: Forfarshire
Party	Candidate	Votes	%	±%
Unionist	Harry Hope	8,852	42.2	−6.9
Liberal	William Scott	6,901	32.8	+4.8
Labour	Charles Gallie	5,257	25.0	+2.1
Majority		1,951	9.4	−11.7
Turnout		21,010	70.7	+2.4
Registered electors		29,737		
Unionist hold		Swing	−5.9	

=== Elections in the 1930s ===
General election 1931: Forfarshire
Party	Candidate	Votes	%	±%
Unionist	William T. Shaw	13,912	61.4	+19.2
Liberal	William Scott	8,731	38.6	+5.8
Majority		5,181	22.8	+13.4
Turnout		22,643	75.2	+4.5
Unionist hold		Swing		

General election 1935: Forfarshire
Party	Candidate	Votes	%	±%
Unionist	William T. Shaw	13,505	60.2	−1.2
Liberal	William Scott	8,922	39.8	+1.2
Majority		4,583	20.4	−2.4
Turnout		22,427	71.5	−3.7
Unionist hold		Swing	-1.2	

=== Elections in the 1940s ===
General Election 1939–40:

Another General Election was required to take place before the end of 1940. The political parties had been making preparations for an election to take place from 1939 and by the end of this year, the following candidates had been selected;

- Unionist: William T. Shaw
- Liberal:

General election 1945: Forfarshire
Party	Candidate	Votes	%	±%
Unionist	Simon Ramsay	13,615	51.6	−8.6
Labour	E Douglas	8,199	31.1	New
Liberal	Philip Fothergill	4,575	17.3	−22.5
Majority		5,416	20.5	+0.1
Turnout		26,389	69.1	−2.4
Unionist hold		Swing		
