= Martin White (politician) =

Scottish businessman and Liberal Party politician (1858 – 1928)

James Martin White (usually known to as Martin White or J. Martin White) (1858 – 7 July 1928) was a wealthy Scottish businessman and Liberal Party politician. He also took a keen interest in the establishment of the scientific study of sociology in association with his boyhood friend Patrick Geddes and was an enthusiastic supporter of the development of the pipe organ.

White was born in New York City, the son of wealthy jute merchant James Farquhar White and his wife Elizabeth Grundy. White Sr. had, in 1849, established a 'dry goods' company, J F White & Co. in New York selling a variety of imported and domestic textiles. However, with the onset of the American Civil War he had returned home to Scotland and leased Castle Huntly, Perthshire as the family home. In 1880 they bought and moved to a baronial castle at Balruddery, Angus, near the city of Dundee. He ran his family business from Dundee and New York, but took a back seat to pursue political and scientific interests.

J Martin White studied engineering at Cassel in Germany and was very interested in the technological innovations of his time, becoming chairman of the Dundee Technical Institute. He was a keen photographer and had his own darkroom from the late 1870s. In April 1881 he and his father, James F White, installed electricity at their house, Balruddery by Longforgan, outside Dundee. They generated the electricity with a Siemens SDJ Shuntwound 50-volt dynamo driven by a turbine on a stream on the estate and thus established probably the first domestic generating plant in Scotland and the second, after Cragside, in Britain. Martin White was also a collector and connoisseur of Japanese art.

== Parliamentary career ==
By the 1890s White had become increasingly wealthy through the family business, J F White & Co.

He first stood for Parliament at the 1892 general election, when he unsuccessfully contested St Andrews Burghs. When the Liberal member of parliament for Forfarshire, Sir John Rigby was appointed a Lord Justice of Appeal in 1894, it was expected that White would be the party's candidate at the ensuing by-election. However, a London-based stock-broker, Henry Robson was chosen, with the result that the seat was lost to the Liberal Unionists.

A general election was held in the following year, and on this occasion White was chosen to contest the seat. He regained the seat comfortably for the Liberals, with a majority of 441 votes.

His membership of the Commons was to be brief, however. Following weeks of rumours, the Dundee Advertiser reported on 14 November 1896 that he had resigned his seat. This was initially denied by his private secretary, who stated that he simply gone to India on business, and expected to return for the opening of parliament. However, on 20 November, the executive committee of the Forfarshire Liberal Association received an angry letter from White. In it, he stated that he had not intended to resign. However he felt the story had been inserted in the Advertiser by members of the committee, and this act of disloyalty meant that he no longer had any obligations to the party. Accordingly, he resigned his seat, by accepting appointment as Steward of the Chiltern Hundreds. The reason for the rumours circulating in Dundee and for his resignation were that a court case for breach of promise to marry had been brought by clergyman's daughter Helen Grant. She and White had known each other from the age of twelve and had had a longstanding affair. Ella Grant claimed that she had become pregnant and had refused the abortion that had been suggested by White. White made an out-of-cort settlement and the case never became public knowledge at the time.

White was subsequently chosen as prospective Liberal candidate for the Wilton Division of Wiltshire. However, when a by-election occurred in July 1900, the Second Boer War was in progress. The party decided not to contest the seat, allowing James Morrison, an army officer, invalided from the front in South Africa, to be returned unopposed. At the general election in October 1900, White did contest Wilton, but Morrison held the seat with a majority of 841 votes (12.6% of the total).

At the 1906 general election, he failed to be elected at Great Yarmouth. He lodged an election petition, attempting to have the result overturned due to alleged bribery, treating and illegal payments by his Conservative opponent Arthur Fell. The election court found that treating and bribery had indeed taken place, but the two judges sitting on the case did not agree whether Fell was responsible for the actions of a Mr Baker who was found to have had acted illegally. The first judge, Justice Channell, held that Baker was acting as an agent of Fell; but the more senior judge, Justice Grantham, held that Fell was not responsible, and the petition was therefore dismissed. However, the outcome was widely denounced as perverse, and was one of a series of election petition judgments in which Grantham (himself a former Conservative MP) was seen to have acted in a partisan manner. The judgment in the Yarmouth petition was the subject of a debate in the Commons in July 1906 in which Grantham's partisanship was widely condemned.

== Academic endowments and Philanthropy ==
White developed a close friendship with Patrick Geddes, and endowed a chair of botany for him at University College Dundee. Geddes was developing the field of sociology, and White began generously funding the teaching of the subject at the University of London. He eventually provided an endowment to create a Department of Sociology at the university. A lifelong philanthropist, each July and August for over 15 years he turned a farmhouse on the estate into a holiday camp for poor and disabled children from the slums of Dundee, enabling over 200 children a year to benefit from two weeks of clean air, healthy outdoor activities and good food. In 1892 he limited outdoor labourers on his estate to a 9-hour day, granting them also a half-day on Saturdays and a week's annual holiday. In 1903 he instituted a pension scheme for all employees on the Balruddery Estate. Some of the many other organisations benefiting from his largesse included the Scottish Amateur Gymnastics Association, St Andrew's University, Dundee Medical School and Dundee Technical Institute.

== Development of the pipe organ ==
White developed a love of the pipe organ, becoming an expert on the instrument, and president of the Organ Club. He financially supported Robert Hope-Jones in his development of the theatre organ. In the central hall at Balruddery he had installed an organ that, originally built by Casson and voiced by Thynne, had been reconstructed by Hope-Jones with electric action, double and pizzicato touches and some new stops. In 1913, George Laing Miller, in The Recent Revolution in Organ Building wrote:

Mr White... has managed to devote much time and thought to the art of organ playing and organ building...All honor to Martin White!

== Family life ==
White was married twice. On 6 August 1898 he married Mary MacRae, a watercolourist, and they had two children. Due to his infidelity the marriage broke down in 1906, and the couple were divorced in 1912. Mary MacRae White went on to be a successful artist in the United States.

In 1913 he married Alice (Priscilla) Frost, a widow.

== Death ==
J Martin White died suddenly at Balruddery in July 1928. He was buried locally, with a monument to his memory erected in Liff Parish Church.

Parliament of the United Kingdom
Preceded by Charles Maule Ramsay	Member of Parliament for Forfarshire; 1895 – 1897	Succeeded by John Sinclair
