= James Falconer =

British politician (1856–1931)

Member of Parliament for Forfarshire
- In office 15 November 1922 – 9 October 1924
- Preceded by: William Thomas Shaw
- Succeeded by: Sir Harry Hope
- In office 27 February 1909 – 25 November 1918
- Preceded by: John Sinclair
- Succeeded by: William Thomas Shaw

Personal details
- Born: 9 June 1856 Carmyllie, Forfarshire, Scotland
- Died: 21 April 1931 (aged 74) Kensington, London, England
- Party: Liberal
- Education: University of Edinburgh

James Falconer (9 June 1856 – 21 April 1931) was a Scottish solicitor and Liberal Party politician.

== Family and education ==
Falconer was born in Carmyllie, Forfarshire, the son of Donald Falconer. He was educated at Arbroath High School and the University of Edinburgh where he obtained his MA degree. He married Ada Kennedy.

== Career ==
Falconer went in for the law and qualified as a solicitor. in 1914 he became a member of the Writers to the Signet, and he specialised in contract law. He became the principal partner in the firm of Gordon, Falconer & Fairweather of Edinburgh. Falconer was also the tenant of large farm in Forfarshire, and manager of a second.

== Politics ==
=== Background ===
Falconer was active in Liberal politics in Scotland, holding various positions in the Scottish party organisation. He was Chairman of the Scottish Reform Club and secretary of the Scottish Liberal Association in which post he was responsible for promoting and publicising the party and its politics.

=== 1909–1918 ===
In 1909, a by-election was caused in Forfarshire by the elevation to the peerage as Baron Pentland of the sitting Liberal MP John Sinclair. At a meeting of Forfarshire Liberal Association in Arbroath, Falconer was unanimously selected as the candidate to succeed Sinclair. The by-election was held on 27 February 1909 and Falconer held the seat with a majority of 2,452 votes over his Unionist opponent R. L. Blackburn, KC. He then retained his seat until the 1918 general election when he was defeated by the Unionist, Captain W. T. Shaw. In this election neither Falconer nor Shaw received the government coupon but Shaw's name had apparently been incorrectly included in the final official list of Coalition candidates which may have been enough to gain him the extra votes he needed to defeat Falconer by a majority of 518.

=== 1922–1924 ===
Falconer regained Forfarshire from Shaw at the 1922 general election winning by 1,496 in a straight fight. He held his seat in 1923 again in a head to head contest with Shaw, this time by a reduced majority of 847. By the 1924 general election however, the Labour Party had adopted a candidate and in a three-cornered contest, the anti-Tory vote being split and the Liberals in national decline, the new Conservative candidate Sir Harry Hope was able to win the seat by a margin of 3,441 votes over Falconer.

Falconer did not stand for Parliament again.

=== Marconi Committee ===
In March 1912, the Post Office agreed a tender with the British Marconi Wireless Telegraph Company to build an imperial wireless network. Over the course of the summer of 1912, allegations surfaced that high-ranking members of H H Asquith’s government had profited by improper use of the information about this lucrative contract. Among those accused in the scandal were the Postmaster General Herbert Samuel, Attorney General Rufus Isaacs, David Lloyd George who was Chancellor of the Exchequer and the Master of Elibank who was Chief Whip. Falconer was appointed to the Select Committee set up by the House of Commons to look into the affair. According to one historian, Falconer and his Liberal colleague Frederick Handel Booth were determined to prevent any disclosures damaging to the ministers in opposition to the roles of the Conservative members of the Committee Lord Robert Cecil and Leopold Amery. Falconer's experience as a Liberal propagandist and lawyer served him well as he took a prominent part in the examination and cross-examination of witnesses, although he had been forewarned by Isaacs that he had purchased some shares in the American Marconi Company. He then produced a draft report which was to be substantially embodied in the majority report adopted by the Liberal, Labour and Irish Nationalist members of the committee in preference to the report drafted by Sir Albert Spicer, the chairman of the committee, who had formed a more critical view of the Liberal ministers involved. The ministers were all cleared of wrongdoing by the Select Committee, although it emerged that not only Isaacs but Lloyd George and Elibank had also purchased shares in the American Marconi Company but not the British company which had been awarded the Post Office contract. The ministers were required to apologise to Parliament.

=== Political issues ===
Falconer was a strong proponent of land reform. From the time of his first election address in the Forfarshire by-election he identified himself as a land reformer, supporting government proposals to give smallholders security of tenure at a fair rent and providing capital for new buildings. He took a leading role in the enacting of the Small Landholders (Scotland) Act 1911 which incorporated the grant of security of tenure at fair rent into law and he was the founder of the Scottish Rural Workers Society, a friendly society designed to provide social insurance payments in the event of sickness or prolonged absence from work. In 1925 he was appointed to a joint Board of Agriculture and Scottish Office inquiry into unemployment among farm workers and related social insurance schemes. In 1917 he served on the Board of Trade parliamentary committee set to deal with the question of the cheap supply of electric power. The committee concluded that a national, comprehensive system for the generation and supply of electricity at the cheapest possible rate should be instituted after the end of the Great War to ensure the competitiveness of the industry, replacing the current organisation of the industry in small areas under many separate authorities which were not large enough to research or sustain the necessary scientific improvements.

== Death ==
Falconer died at his London home, Thorney Court in Kensington on 21 April 1931 aged 74 years.

Parliament of the United Kingdom
Preceded by John Sinclair	Member of Parliament for Forfarshire; 1909 – 1918	Succeeded by William Thomas Shaw
Preceded by William Thomas Shaw	Member of Parliament for Forfarshire; 1922 – 1924	Succeeded by Sir Harry Hope
