= Charles Carnegie (politician) =

British politician

Charles Carnegie DL, JP (14 May 1833 – 12 September 1906), styled The Honourable from 1855, was a British Liberal politician.

He was a younger son of Sir James Carnegie, 5th Baronet (and de jure 8th Earl of Southesk), and his wife Charlotte, second daughter of Reverend Daniel Lysons. As his elder brother James was confirmed as 9th Earl of Southesk in 1855, Carnegie received the precedence and the style of an earl's younger son.

He entered the British Army as a 2nd lieutenant of the 23rd Regiment of Foot (Royal Welsh Fusiliers) in 1850. Three years later Carnegie was promoted to a lieutenant of the 27th (Inniskilling) Regiment of Foot. He retired in 1855 and was returned to Parliament for Forfarshire in 1860, a seat he held until 1872. Carnegie was appointed Inspector of Constabulary for Scotland in 1872, and served until 1884. From then until his death he was a justice of the peace. He also a deputy lieutenant for Forfarshire.

Parliament of the United Kingdom
Preceded by Viscount Duncan	Member of Parliament for Forfarshire; 1860 – 1872	Succeeded by James William Barclay
