= Harry Hope =

Scottish Unionist politician and agriculturalist

Sir Harry Hope, 1st Baronet (24 September 1865 – 29 December 1959) was a Scottish Unionist politician and agriculturalist.

== Life ==
The youngest son of James Hope, who farmed extensively in the Lothians, Harry Hope followed in his father's footsteps. He became President of Scottish Chamber of Agriculture in 1908, and in the same year was invited to join the Scottish Agricultural Commission which was invited by the government of the Dominion of Canada to report on the country's agricultural resources.

Hope married Margaret Binnie Hope (née Holms) in 1897, and had children James Hope, Robert Holms-Kerr Hope, and Margaret Ralston Hope.

Hope sat as member of parliament (MP) for Buteshire from 1910 to 1918, Stirlingshire and Clackmannan Western from 1918 to 1922, and Forfar from 1924 to 1931. He was knighted in 1920. In 1932, he was created a Baronet of Kinnettles in the County of Angus.

During the debate on the repeal of the Corn Production Act in July 1921, Hope stated that, ‘The agricultural industry is the mainstay of this country’. By 1921, he owned 4 farms extending to a total of 1400 acres, in the Dunbar area. In the same year, he addressed a meeting in the following terms: "The worker could not be forgotten ... perhaps in the past he was too much forgotten ... he was a real partner in the industry." At the end of the 1930s, Hope cited Algerian agriculture as a threat to domestic potato production. He was often seen as a reliable representative of the interests of East Lothian farmers within the Parliament (as a Unionist), both before and after the war.

Hope sat on numerous boards and was Convenor of Angus County Council for many years. He was appointed Deputy Lieutenant of the county in 1936 and Vice Lieutenant in 1938.

Hope died on 29 December 1959, aged 94.

== Coat of arms ==
Coat of arms of Harry Hope
Crest A broken terrestrial globe surmounted by a rainbow proper. Escutcheon Azure, a chevron between two bezants in chief and the sun in his splendour in base or. Motto At Spes Non Fracta (But hope is unbroken)

Parliament of the United Kingdom
Preceded by Norman Lamont	Member of Parliament for Buteshire; January 1910 – 1918	constituency abolished
New constituency	Member of Parliament for Stirlingshire & Clackmannan Western; 1918 – 1922	Succeeded by Tom Johnston
Preceded by James Falconer	Member of Parliament for Forfar; 1924 – 1931	Succeeded by William Thomas Shaw
Baronetage of the United Kingdom
New creation	Baronet (of Kinnettles); 1931–1959	Succeeded by James Hope
