= Willingdon Dam =

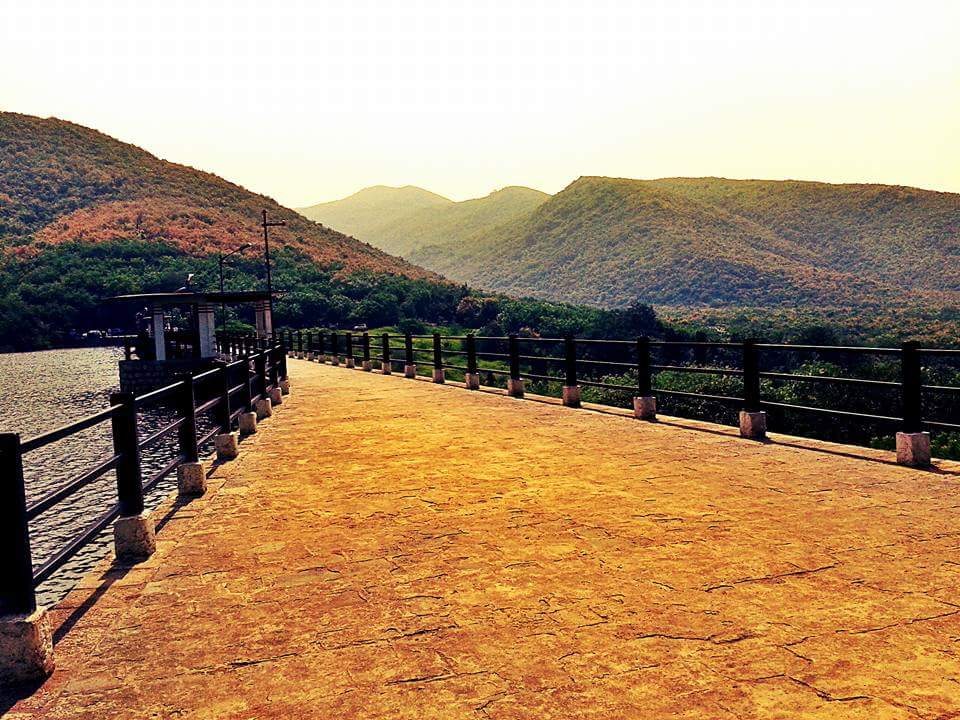
- Willingdon Dam

- Location in Gujarat
- Interactive map of Willingdon Dam
- Country: India
- Location: Junagadh
- Coordinates: 21°30′16.5″N 70°28′51.4″E
- Status: Operational

Dam and spillways
- Impounds: Kalwa river

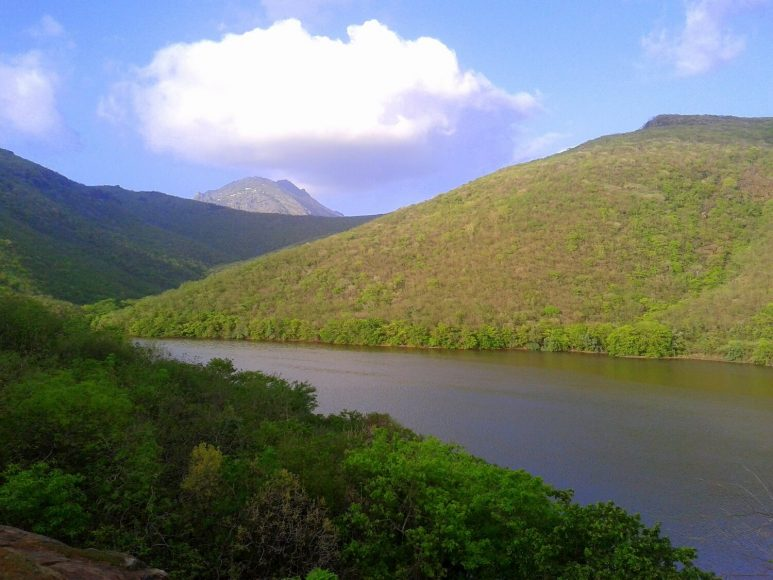
Willingdon Dam on Kalwa river

Willingdon Dam is situated to the east of the town of Junagadh, near the foot of Datar hills, in Gujarat State, and built on the Kalwa River in India. The dam was named after Marquess Willingdon, the Governor of India at that time. On the top of adjoining Datar hills is a shrine of Saint Jamiyal Shah Datar, which is a popular place of worship for both Hindus and Muslims. The climb to the Datar hills is about 2500 steps or 847 metres (2,779 ft).

== History ==
The Sardar Patel Dam, formerly known as Wellington Dam, is a historic dam located in Junagadh, India. Constructed using Girnar black stones, its construction began on May 11, 1929, with a Ganesh Puja performed by Raj Jyotishi Shambhuprasad Joshi under the reign of Nawab Mohabbat Khan III.

The dam was designed by E. Proctor Sims and built by a team of Indian and English engineers and craftsmen, including Thakarshi Ghiya, KJ Gandhi, Vasta Ladha, and Raghav Kanji. After a seven-year construction period, it was inaugurated on January 10, 1936, by the Viceroy of India, Dr. Wellington.

Standing at 44 feet high, the dam has a storage capacity of one billion gallons. On November 9, 2008, it was renamed Sardar Patel Dam and is currently owned by the Junagadh Municipal Corporation.

== See also ==
- Girnar
- Sakkarbaug Zoological Garden
- Junagadh State
- Nawab of Junagarh
