= Freeman Freeman-Thomas, 1st Marquess of Willingdon =

British politician and colonial governor (1866–1941)

His Excellency The Most Honourable The Marquess of Willingdon GCSI GCMG GCIE GBE PC
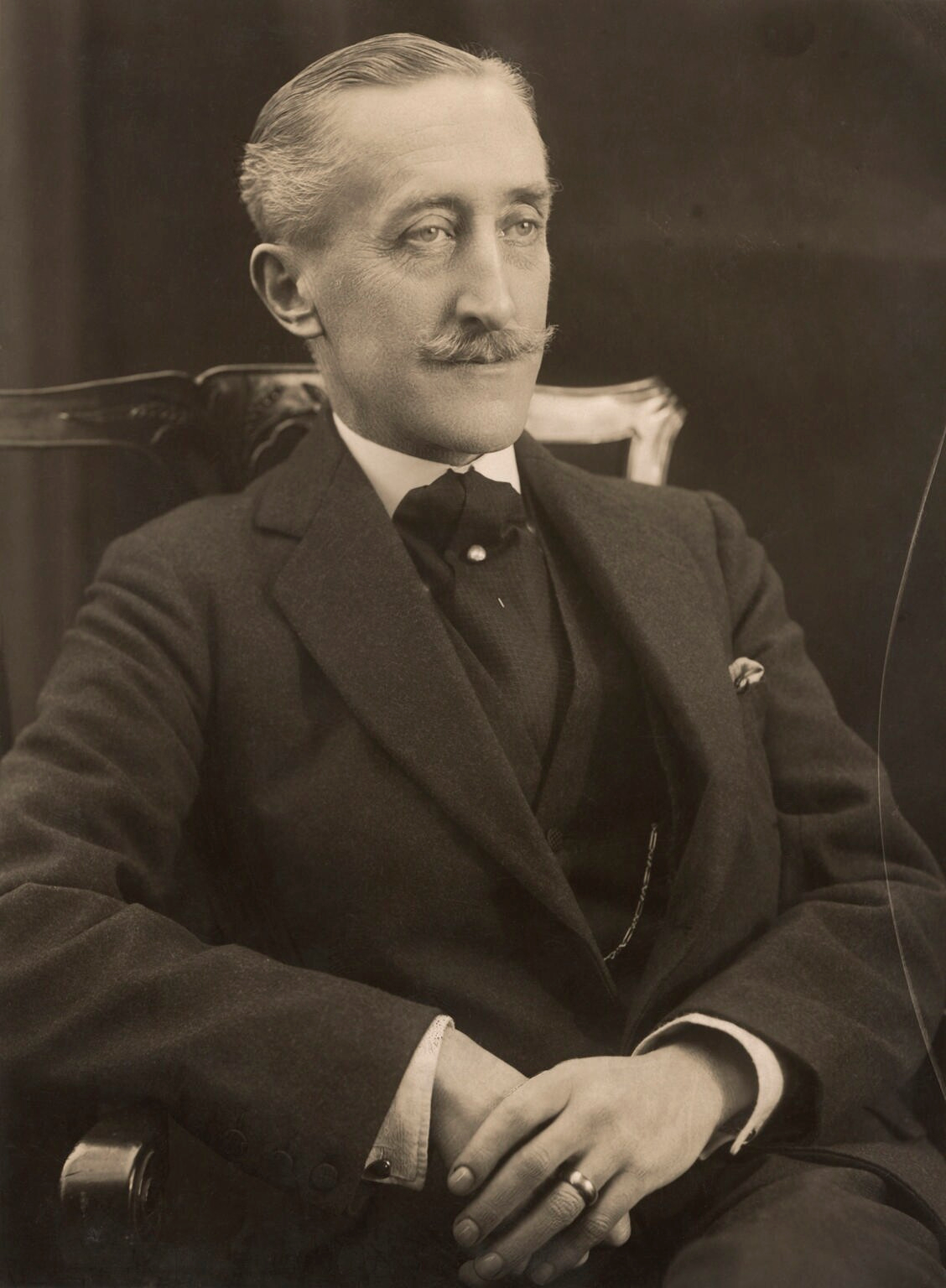
- Freeman-Thomas c. 1915

Viceroy and Governor-General of India
- In office 18 April 1931 – 18 April 1936
- Monarchs: George V Edward VIII
- Prime Minister: Ramsay MacDonald; Stanley Baldwin
- Preceded by: The Lord Irwin
- Succeeded by: The Marquess of Linlithgow

13th Governor General of Canada
- In office 5 August 1926 – 4 April 1931
- Monarch: George V
- Prime Minister: Canadian • W. L. M. King • R. B. Bennett; British • Stanley Baldwin • Ramsay MacDonald
- Preceded by: The Viscount Byng of Vimy
- Succeeded by: The Earl of Bessborough

More...

Personal details
- Born: 12 September 1866 Eastbourne, East Sussex, England
- Died: 12 August 1941 (aged 74) Ebury Street, Westminster, London, England
- Spouse: Marie Adelaide Brassey (m. 1892)
- Education: Eton College; Trinity College, Cambridge
- Profession: Politician

Military service
- Allegiance: United Kingdom
- Branch/service: British Army
- Years of service: 1886–1901
- Rank: Second Lieutenant; Major
- Unit: Royal Sussex Militia Artillery

Freeman Freeman-Thomas, 1st Marquess of Willingdon (12 September 1866 – 12 August 1941), styled as the Earl of Willingdon between 1931 and 1936, was a British Liberal politician and administrator who served as Governor General of Canada and as Viceroy and Governor-General of India.

Freeman-Thomas was born in England and educated at Eton College and then the University of Cambridge before serving for 15 years in the Sussex Artillery. He then entered the diplomatic and political fields, acting as aide-de-camp to his father-in-law when the latter was Governor of Victoria and, in 1900, was elected to the British House of Commons. He thereafter occupied a variety of government posts, including secretary to the British prime minister and, after being raised to the peerage as Baron Willingdon, as Lord-in-waiting to King George V. From 1913, Willingdon held gubernatorial and viceregal offices throughout the British Empire, starting with the governorship of Bombay and then the governorship of Madras, before he was in 1926 appointed as the Governor-General of Canada to replace the Viscount Byng of Vimy, occupying the post until succeeded by the Earl of Bessborough in 1931. Willingdon was immediately thereafter appointed as Viceroy and Governor-General of India to replace Lord Irwin (later created Earl of Halifax), and he served in the post until succeeded by the Marquess of Linlithgow in 1936.

After the end of his viceregal tenure, Willingdon was installed as the Lord Warden of the Cinque Ports and was elevated in the peerage as the Marquess of Willingdon. After representing Britain at a number of organisations and celebrations, Willingdon died in 1941 at his home in London, and his ashes were interred in Westminster Abbey.

== Early life and education ==
Freeman Thomas was born the only son of Freeman Frederick Thomas, an officer in the rifle brigade of Ratton and Yapton, and his wife, Mabel, daughter of Henry Brand, Parliamentary Secretary to the Treasury (later Speaker of the House of Commons, who retired as 1st Viscount Hampden). Before he was two, Thomas' father had died and he was raised thereafter by his mother, who sent him to Eton College. There, he acted as President of the Eton Society and was for three years a member of the school's cricket team, serving as captain of the playing eleven during his final year. He carried this enthusiasm for sport on to the University of Cambridge, where he was accepted to Trinity College after leaving Eton, and was drafted into the Cambridge playing eleven, playing for Sussex and I Zingari. His father had also played for Sussex. Upon his general admission from university, he then volunteered for fifteen years for the Sussex Artillery, achieving the rank of major.

== Marriage and political career ==
In 1892, he assumed the additional surname of Freeman by deed poll and married the Hon. Marie Brassey, the daughter of Thomas Brassey, then recently created Baron Brassey. Freeman-Thomas often cited her as a source of support, stating once: "My wife has been a constant inspiration and encouragement." The couple had two sons: Gerard, born 3 May 1893, and Inigo, born 25 July 1899. Gerard was killed in World War I on 14 September 1914, and Inigo eventually succeeded his father as Marquess of Willingdon.

In 1897 Freeman-Thomas was appointed aide-de-camp to his father-in-law, who was then the Governor of Victoria, Australia. Upon his return to the United Kingdom, Freeman-Thomas joined the Liberal Party and in 1900 was elected to the British House of Commons to represent the borough of Hastings. He then served as a junior lord of the Treasury in the Liberal Cabinet that sat from December 1905 to January 1906. Though he lost in the January 1906 elections, Freeman-Thomas returned to the House of Commons by winning the by-election for Bodmin, and, for some time, served as a secretary to the prime minister, H. H. Asquith. For his services in government, Freeman-Thomas was in 1910 elevated to the peerage as Baron Willingdon of Ratton in the County of Sussex, and the following year was appointed as Lord-in-waiting to King George V, becoming a favourite tennis partner of the monarch. His father-in-law was created Earl Brassey at the coronation in that year.

== Governorship of Bombay ==
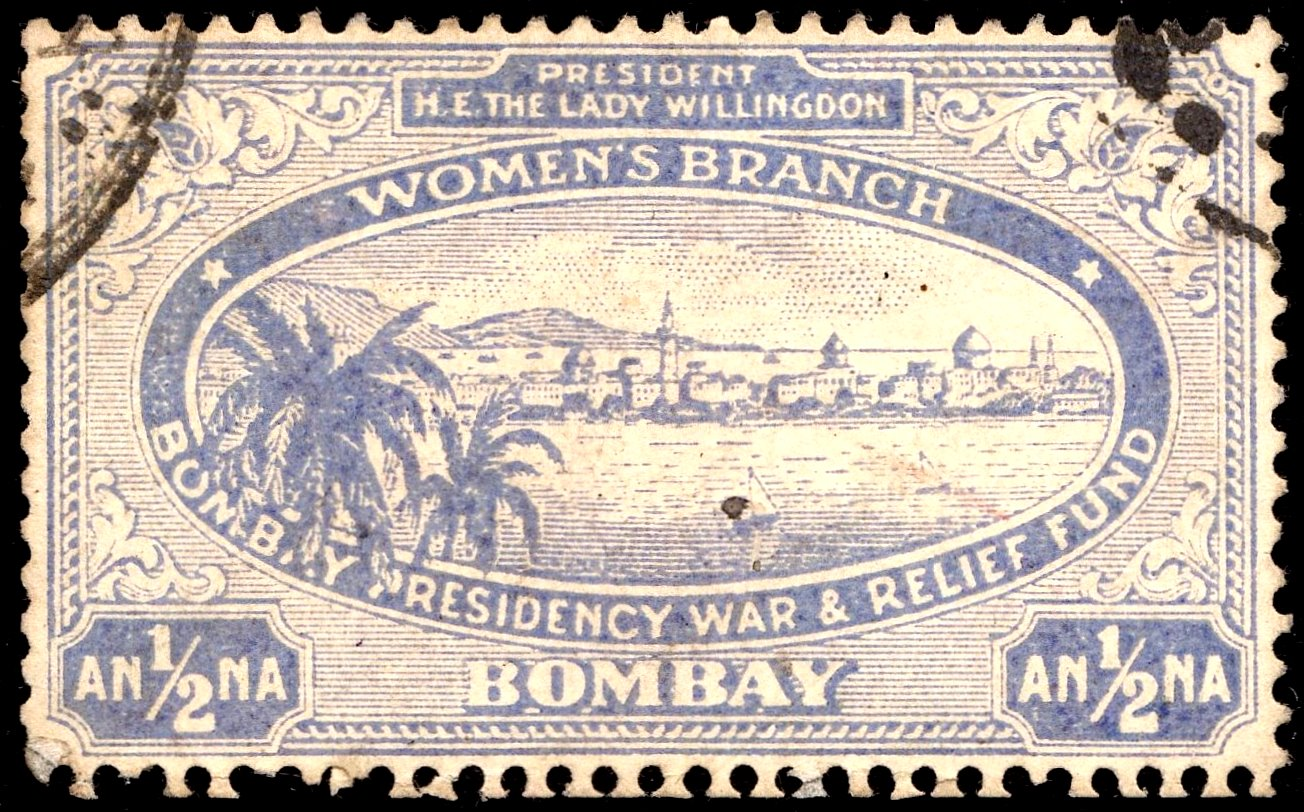
A 1916 charity stamp for the Bombay Presidency War and Relief Fund organised by Lady Willingdon.

On 17 February 1913, Willingdon was appointed as the Crown Governor of Bombay, replacing the Lord Sydenham of Combe, and to mark this event, Willingdon was on 12 March 1913 honoured with induction into the Order of the Indian Empire as a Knight Grand Commander (additional). With a mandate from George V to 'to smash through all fences which socially divide communities', Willingdon attempted to take Indian friends to the Royal Bombay Yacht Club. When they were refused entry to the Europeans-only club, the outraged Willingdon resigned his membership and in 1917 founded the Willingdon Sports Club which would have no colour bar.

Within a year of Willingdon's appointment as governor, the First World War erupted, and India, as a part of the British Empire, was immediately drawn into the conflict. Lord Willingdon strove to serve the Allied cause, taking responsibility for treating the wounded from the Mesopotamian campaign. In the midst of those times, Mahatma Gandhi returned to Bombay from South Africa and Willingdon was one of the first persons to welcome him and invite him to Government House for a formal meeting. This was the first meeting Willingdon had with Gandhi and he later described the Indian spiritual leader as "honest, but a Bolshevik and for that reason very dangerous."

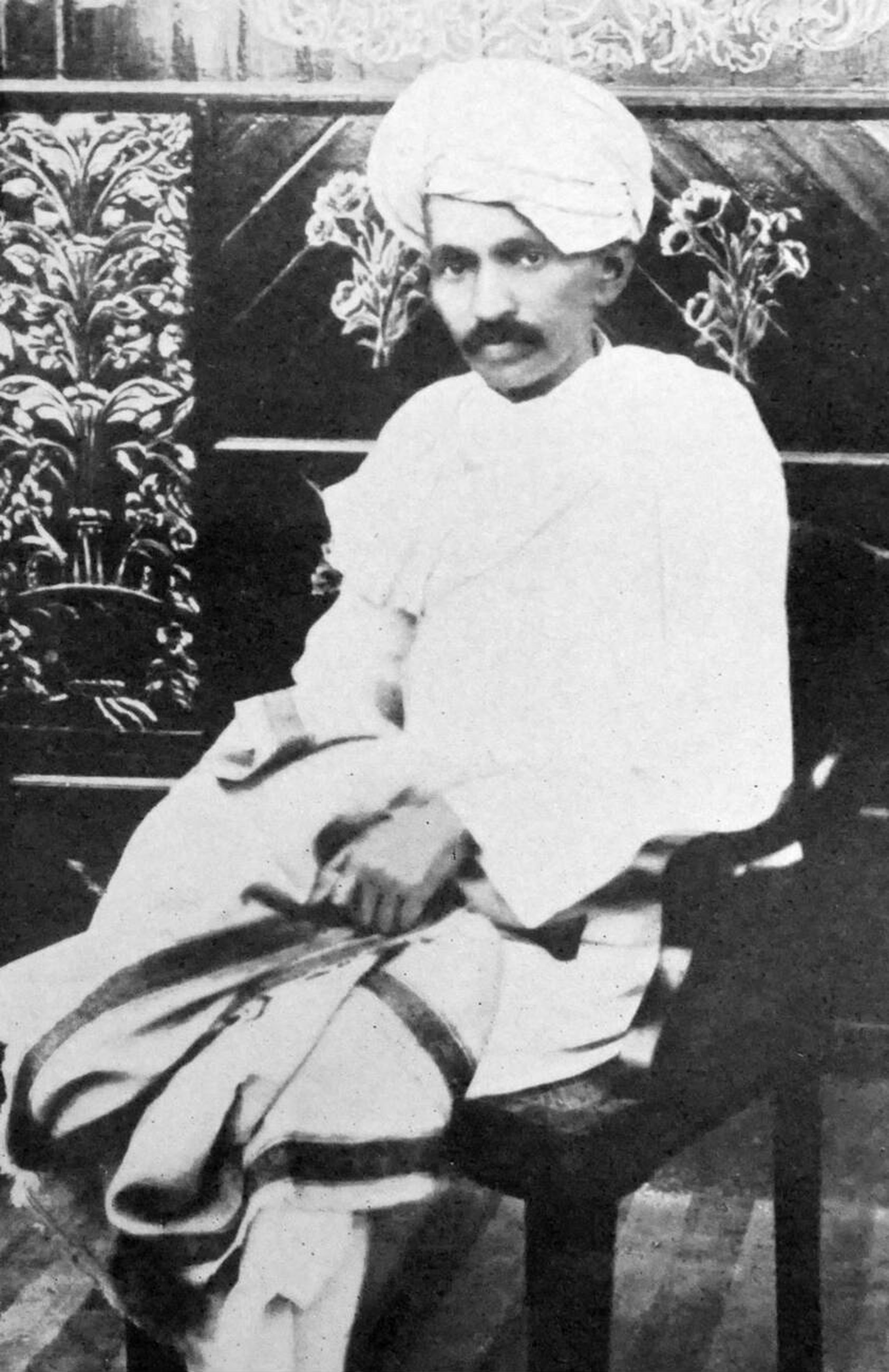
Mahatma Gandhi, whose return to India and subsequent nationalistic activities would cause problems for Willingdon as Crown Governor of Bombay and Madras

In 1917, the year before Willingdon's resignation of the governorship, a severe famine broke out in the Kheda region of the Bombay Presidency, which had far-reaching effects on the economy and left farmers in no position to pay their taxes. Still, the government insisted that tax not only be paid but also implemented a 23% increase to the levies to take effect that year. Kheda thus became the setting for Gandhi's first satyagraha in India, and, with support from Sardar Vallabhbhai Patel, Narhari Parikh, Mohanlal Pandya, and Ravishankar Vyas, organised a Gujarat sabha. The people under Gandhi's influence then rallied together and sent a petition to Willingdon, asking that he cancel the taxes for that year. However, the Cabinet refused and advised the Governor to begin confiscating property by force, leading Gandhi to thereafter employ non-violent resistance to the government, which eventually succeeded and made Gandhi famous throughout India after Willingdon's departure from the colony. For his actions there, in relation to governance and the war effort, Willingdon was on 3 June 1918 appointed by the King as a Knight Grand Commander of the Order of the Star of India.

== Governorship of Madras ==
Willingdon returned to the United Kingdom from Bombay only briefly before he was appointed on 10 April 1919 as the governor of Madras. This posting came shortly after the Montagu–Chelmsford Reforms of 1918 were formalised by the Government of India Act, which distributed power in India between the executive and legislative bodies. Thus, in November 1920, Willingdon dropped the writs of election for the first election for the Madras Legislative Council; however, due to their adherence to Gandhi's non-cooperation movement, the Indian National Congress party refused to run any candidates and the Justice Party was subsequently swept into power. Willingdon appointed A. Subbarayalu Reddiar as his premier and Prince Arthur, Duke of Connaught and Strathearn (a former Governor General of Canada), opened the first meeting of the Legislative Assembly.

The following year, the Governor found himself dealing with a series of communal riots that in August 1921 broke out in the Malabar District. Following a number of cases of arson, looting, and assaults, Willingdon declared martial law just before the government of India sent in a large force to quell the riots. At around the same time, over 10,000 workers in the Buckingham and Carnatic Mills of Madras city organised for six months a general strike contemporaneous with the non-cooperation movement, which also sparked riots between pro- and anti-strike workers that were again only put down with police intervention.

When he returned once more to the United Kingdom at the end of his tenure as the Governor of Madras, Willingdon was made a viscount, becoming on 24 June 1924 the Viscount Willingdon, of Ratton in the County of Sussex.

== Governor General of Canada ==
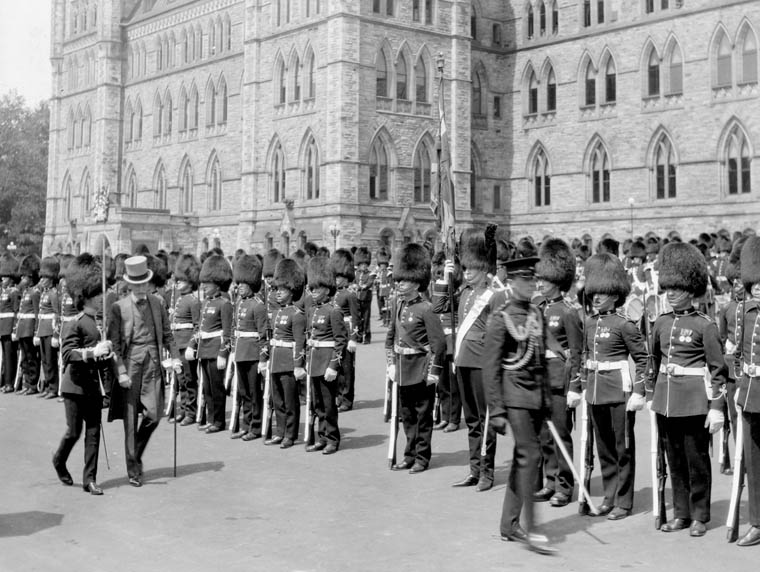
The Viscount Willingdon inspects the Governor General's Foot Guards on Parliament Hill as part of the Dominion Day celebrations, 1927, the 60th jubilee of Canadian Confederation

It was announced on 5 August 1926 that George V had, by commission under the royal sign-manual and signet, approved the recommendation of his British prime minister, Stanley Baldwin, to appoint Willingdon as his representative in Canada. The sitting Conservative British Cabinet had initially not considered Willingdon as a candidate for the governor generalcy, as he was seen to have less of the necessary knowledge of affairs and public appeal that other individuals held. However, the King himself put forward Willingdon's name for inclusion in the list sent to Canada, and it was that name that the then Canadian prime minister, William Lyon Mackenzie King, chose as his preference for the nomination to the King. George V readily accepted, and Willingdon was notified of his appointment while on a diplomatic mission in China.

This would be the last Canadian viceregal appointment made by the monarch in his or her capacity as sovereign of the United Kingdom, as it was decided at the Imperial Conference in October 1926 that the Dominions of the British Empire would thereafter be equal with one another, and the monarch would operate for a specific country only under the guidance of that country's ministers. Though this was not formalised until the enactment of the Statute of Westminster on 11 December 1931, the concept was brought into practice at the start of Willingdon's tenure as Governor General of Canada.

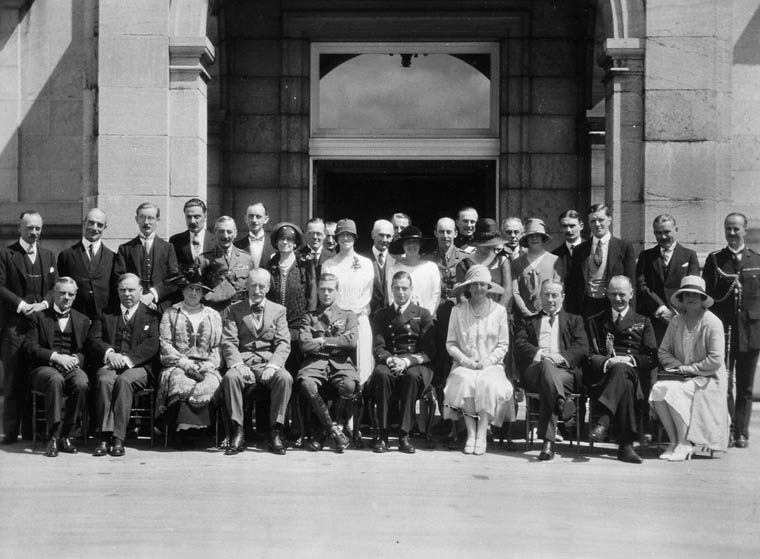
Princes Edward and George, along with Viscount Willingdon, outside Rideau Hall's main door, August 1927

The Balfour Declaration of 1926, issued during the Imperial Conference, also declared that governors-general would cease to act as representatives of the British government in diplomatic relations between the United Kingdom and individual dominions. Accordingly, in 1928, the United Kingdom appointed its first High Commissioner to Canada thus effectively ending the governor general's, and Willingdon's, diplomatic role as the British government's envoy to Ottawa.

Willingdon arrived at Quebec City in late 1926, and on 2 October was sworn in as governor-general in a ceremony in the salon rouge of the parliament buildings of Quebec. His following journey to Ottawa to take up residence in the country's official royal and viceroyal home, Rideau Hall, was just the first of many trips Willingdon took around Canada, meeting with a variety of Canadians and bringing with him what was described as "a sense of humour and an air of informality to his duties." He also became the first governor general to travel by air, flying from Ottawa to Montreal and back, as well as the first to make official visits abroad; not only did he tour the Caribbean in 1929, but he further paid a visit to the United States, going there in 1927 to meet with and receive state honours from President Calvin Coolidge. On that visit, the Governor General was welcomed in Washington by the King's emissary to the US, Vincent Massey, who would later himself be appointed as Governor General of Canada.

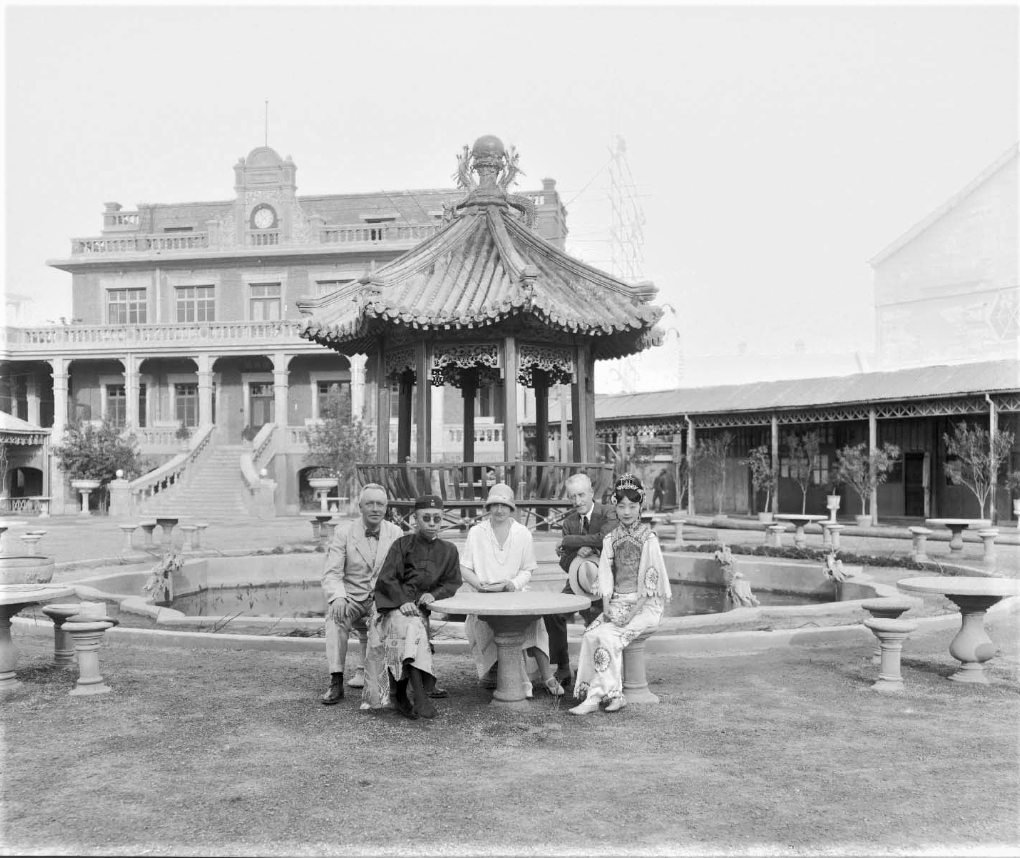
Lord Willingdon with Reginald Johnston and the former Emperor of China in Tianjin, China, 1920s

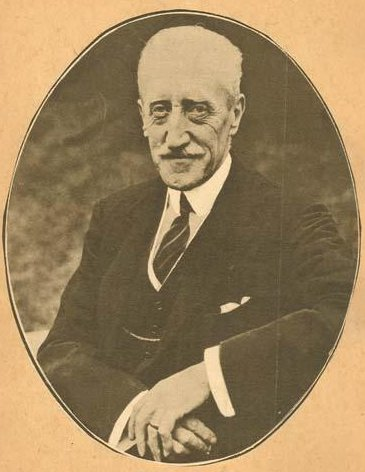
The Marquess of Willingdon in later life.

In Canada, Willingdon hosted members of the Royal Family, including the King's two sons, Prince Edward, Prince of Wales, and Prince George, who, along with Baldwin, came to Canada to participate in the celebrations of the Diamond Jubilee of Confederation. The Princes resided at Rideau Hall and the Prince of Wales, accompanied by Willingdon, dedicated at the Peace Tower both the altar of the Memorial Chamber and the Dominion Carillon, the first playing of which on that day was heard by listeners across the country on the first ever coast-to-coast radio broadcast in Canada. This dedication marked the completion of the Centre Block of Parliament Hill, and the following year, Willingdon moved the annual governor general's New Year's levée to that building from the East Block, where the party had been held since 1870. A few months before the end of his viceregal tenure in Canada, Willingdon was once more elevated in the peerage, becoming on 23 February 1931 the Earl of Willingdon and Viscount Ratendone.

In their time the viceroyal couple, the Earl and Countess of Willingdon fostered their appreciation of the arts, building on previous governor general the Earl Grey's Lord Grey Competition for Music and Drama by introducing the Willingdon Arts Competition, which dispensed awards for painting and sculpture. They also left at Rideau Hall a collection of carpets and objets d'art that they had collected during their travels around India and China, and many of which were restored in 1993 to the Long Gallery of Rideau Hall. However, Willingdon's tastes also included sports, particularly fishing, tennis, skating, skiing, curling, cricket, and golf. For the latter, he in 1927 donated to the Royal Canadian Golf Association the Willingdon Cup for Canadian interprovincial amateur golf competition, which has been contested annually since that year.

During his residence in Ottawa, Willingdon was a regular attendee at home matches of the Ottawa Senators, continuing a tradition of patronage by sitting Governors-General of the local professional club. In 1930, he donated a trophy to be awarded to the Senators player "of the greatest assistance to his team", which the organisation cheekily interpreted as an award for the player to lead the team in assists and dubbed the Willington Trophy.

== Viceroy and Governor-General of India ==
=== Appointment ===
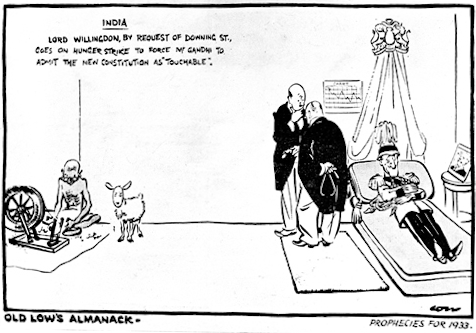
A cartoon from 1932 depicting the Viscount Willingdon on a hunger strike against Gandhi

He had not been Governor General of Canada for five years before Willingdon received word that he was to be sent back to India as that country's viceroy and governor general. After being appointed to the British Privy Council on 20 March 1931, he was sworn in as such on 18 April 1931, merely two weeks after he was replaced in Canada by the Earl of Bessborough. When Willingdon arrived again in India, the country was gripped by the Great Depression and was soon leading Britain's departure from the gold standard, seeing thousands of tonnes of gold shipped to the United Kingdom through the port of Bombay. Of this, Willingdon said: "For the first time in history, owing to the economic situation, Indians are disgorging gold. We have sent to London in the past two or three months, £25,000,000 sterling and I hope that the process will continue."

=== Jailing leaders of Congress ===
Simultaneously, Willingdon found himself dealing with the consequences of the nationalistic movements that Gandhi had earlier started when Willingdon was Governor of Bombay and then Madras. The India Office told Willingdon that he should conciliate only those elements of Indian opinion that were willing to work with the Raj. That did not include Nehru and the Indian National Congress, which launched its Civil Disobedience Movement on 4 January 1932. Therefore, Willingdon took decisive action. He imprisoned Gandhi. He outlawed the Congress, he rounded up all members of the Working Committee and the Provincial Committees and imprisoned them, and banned Congress youth organisations. In total, he imprisoned 80,000 Indian activists. Without most of their leaders, protests were uneven and disorganized, boycotts were ineffective, illegal youth organisations proliferated but were ineffective, more women became involved, and there was terrorism, especially in the North-West Frontier Province. Gandhi remained in prison until 1933. Willingdon relied on his military secretary, Hastings Ismay, for his personal safety.

=== Construction projects ===
It was also by Willingdon's hand, as Governor-in-Council, that the Lloyd Barrage was commissioned, seeing £20 million put into the construction of the barrage across the mouth of the Indus River, which not only provided labour but also brought millions of hectares of land in the Thar Desert under irrigation. Further, Willingdon established the Willingdon Airfield (now known as Safdarjung Airport) in Delhi and, after he was denied entry to the Royal Bombay Yacht Club because he was accompanied by Indian friends, despite his being the Governor of Bombay, Willingdon was motivated to establish the Willingdon Sports Club, with membership open to both Indians and British and which still operates today. As he had been in Canada, Willingdon acted for India as Chief Scout of the Bharat Scouts and Guides and took this role as more than an ex-officio title. Convinced that Scouting would contribute greatly to the welfare of India, he promoted the organisation, especially in rural villages, and requested that J. S. Wilson pay special attention to cooperation between Scouting and village development.

The Construction of New Delhi also took place under his rule.

== Post-viceregal life ==
Once back in the United Kingdom, Willingdon associated with Roland Gwynne. Willingdon was one of the notable guests of parties at Gwynne's East Sussex estate, Folkington Manor. He was also honoured by George V, not only by being appointed as the Lord Warden of the Cinque Ports—one of the higher honours bestowed by the sovereign and normally reserved for members of the Royal Family and former prime ministers—but he was also elevated once more in the peerage, being created Marquess of Willingdon by Edward VIII on 26 May 1936, making him the most recent person to be promoted to such a rank.

Willingdon did not cease diplomatic life altogether: he undertook a goodwill mission to South America, representing the Ibero-American Institute, and chaired the British committee on the commissioning of army officers. In 1940, he also represented the United Kingdom at the celebrations for the centennial of the formation of New Zealand. The next year, however, on 12 August, the Marquess of Willingdon died at 5 Lygon Place, near Ebury Street, in London, and his ashes were interred in Westminster Abbey.

== Honours ==
=== Titles ===
Viceregal styles of the Viscount Willingdon (1926–1931) then the Earl of Willingdon (1931–1936)
- Reference style: His Excellency The Right Honourable (in Canada, also) Son Excellence le très honorable
- Spoken style: Your Excellency (in Canada, also) Votre Excellence

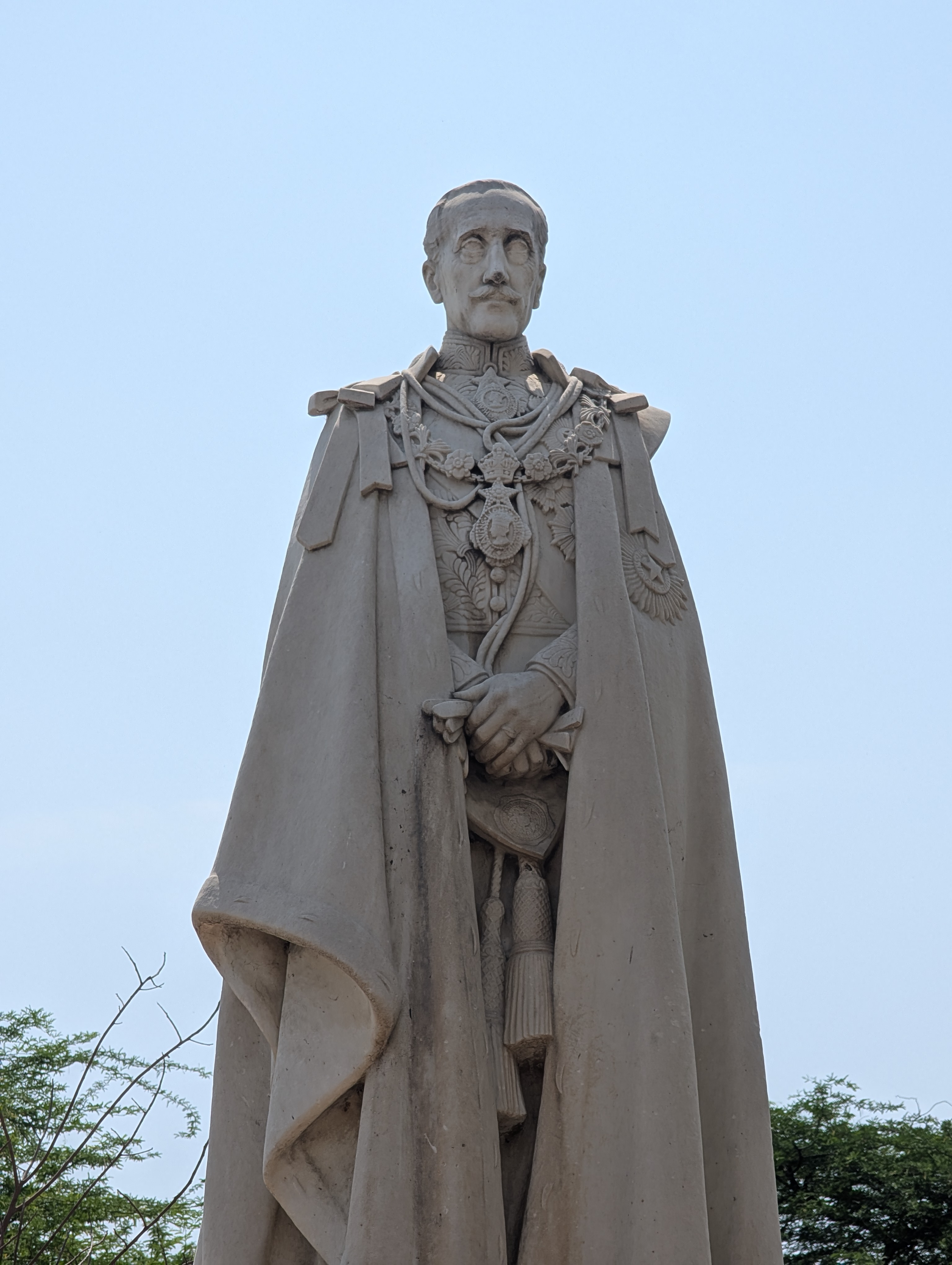
Statue of Lord Willingdon in Coronation Park, Delhi

Appointments

- 18 July 1911 – 31 January 1913: Lord-in-Waiting to His Majesty the King
- (British Raj) 3 June 1918 – 21 July 1941: Knight Grand Commander of the Most Exalted Order of the Star of India (GCSI)
- (United Kingdom) 20 July 1926 – 21 July 1941: Knight Grand Cross of the Most Distinguished Order of Saint Michael and Saint George (GCMG)
- (British Raj) 12 March 1913 – 21 July 1941: Knight Grand Commander of the Most Eminent Order of the Indian Empire (GCIE)
- (United Kingdom) 4 December 1917 – 21 July 1941: Knight Grand Cross of the Most Excellent Order of the British Empire (GBE)
- 5 August 1926 – 4 April 1931: Chief Scout for Canada
- 5 August 1926 – 4 April 1931: Honorary Member of the Royal Military College of Canada Club
- (United Kingdom) 20 March 1931 – 21 July 1941: Member of His Majesty's Most Honourable Privy Council (PC)

Medals

- (United Kingdom) 1902: King Edward VII Coronation Medal
- (United Kingdom) 1911: King George V Coronation Medal
- (United Kingdom) 1935: King George V Silver Jubilee Medal
- (United Kingdom) 1937: King George VI Coronation Medal

=== Honorary military appointments ===
- (Canada) 5 August 1926 – 4 April 1931: Colonel of the Governor General's Horse Guards
- (Canada) 5 August 1926 – 4 April 1931: Colonel of the Governor General's Foot Guards
- (Canada) 5 August 1926 – 4 April 1931: Colonel of the Canadian Grenadier Guards
- (United Kingdom) 1936 – 21 July 1941: Colonel of the 5th battalion of the Royal Sussex Regiment

=== Honorific eponyms ===
Awards

- Canada: Willingdon Arts Competition
- Canada: Willingdon Cup

Organisations

- India: Willingdon Sports Club, Mumbai

Geographic locations

- Alberta: Mount Willingdon
- Alberta: Willingdon
- British Columbia: Willingdon Avenue, Burnaby
- British Columbia: Willingdon Heights, Burnaby
- India: Willingdon Dam, Junagadh
- India: Willingdon Airport, New Delhi (later renamed Safdarjung Airport)
- India: IAF Willingdon, New Delhi
- India: Willingdon Island

Schools

- British Columbia: Willingdon Secondary School, Burnaby
- India: Willingdon College, Sangli
- Quebec: Willingdon Elementary School, Montreal

=== Arms ===
Coat of arms of Freeman Freeman-Thomas, 1st Marquess of Willingdon
Crest 1st: A demi lion rampant Gules charged on the shoulder with an Ermine spot Argent (Freeman); 2nd: Issuant out of an antique crown Azure a boar's head proper (Thomas). Escutcheon Quarterly, 1st and 4th: Argent three lions rampant Gules a chief azure (Thomas); 2nd and 3rd: Ermine two pallets in pale Azure over all three fusils conjoined in fess Or (Freeman). Supporters On either side a freeman armed cap à pie in English armour of the 17th century Proper. Motto Honesty Is The Best Policy

Government offices
Preceded by George Clarke	Governor of Bombay; 17 February 1913 – 16 December 1918	Succeeded by George Lloyd
Preceded by Alexander Cardew	Governor of Madras; 10 April 1919 – 12 April 1924	Succeeded by The Viscount Goschen
Preceded by The Lord Byng of Vimy	Governor General of Canada; 1926–1931	Succeeded by The Earl of Bessborough
Preceded by The Lord Irwin	Viceroy of India; 1931–1936	Succeeded by The Marquess of Linlithgow
Parliament of the United Kingdom
Preceded by William Lucas-Shadwell	Member of Parliament for Hastings; 1900–1906	Succeeded by William Harvey du Cros
Preceded by Thomas Agar-Robartes	Member of Parliament for Bodmin; July 1906 – January 1910	Succeeded by Cecil Grenfell
Court offices
Preceded by The Lord Colebrooke	Lord-in-waiting; 1911–1913	Succeeded by The Lord Ashby St. Ledgers
Honorary titles
Preceded by The Marquess of Reading	Lord Warden of the Cinque Ports; 1936–1941	Succeeded by Winston Churchill
Peerage of the United Kingdom
New creation	Marquess of Willingdon; 1936–1941	Succeeded by Inigo Freeman-Thomas
New creation	Earl of Willingdon; 1931–1941	Succeeded by Inigo Freeman-Thomas
New creation	Viscount Willingdon; 1924–1941	Succeeded by Inigo Freeman-Thomas
New creation	Baron Willingdon; 1910–1941	Succeeded by Inigo Freeman-Thomas
