= William T. Shaw =

British politician

Captain William Thomas Shaw (26 or 27 February 1879 – 20 October 1965) was Unionist Party Member of Parliament for Forfar for two periods, 1918 to 1922 and 1931 to 1945.

Born in Finegand, Glenshee, he was educated at Slochnacraig School and the High School of Dundee and was admitted to the London Stock Exchange in 1901. In the 1910 general election he contested but lost the seat of Dunbartonshire. During World War I, he served in the Royal Army Service Corps.

Shaw married Margret Cassilis in 1908. They remained married until her death in 1949. They had three daughters.

Parliament of the United Kingdom
Preceded by James Falconer	Member of Parliament for Forfar; 1918 – 1922	Succeeded by James Falconer
Preceded by Sir Harry Hope	Member of Parliament for Forfar; 1931 – 1945	Succeeded by Simon Ramsay
