= Balruddery =

Coordinates: 56°28′39″N 3°6′52″W

Balruddery House by Longforgan in Perthshire, Scotland, was designed by David Neave for James Webster circa 1820. In about 1879 it was bought by James F White, who had previously leased Castle Huntly in Longforgan. James White and his son J Martin White had the house extensively remodelled and modernised by Charle Edward and Thomas Saunders Robertson and the White family moved in circa 1881. J Martin White was very interested in the technologies of the day and electricity was installed in the house by April 1881, powered by a generator run off a stream on the estate, possibly the first domestic generating plant in Scotland. Until at least 1960, electricity was still provided by a turbine and generator on the Mill Dam at Balruddery Home Farm.

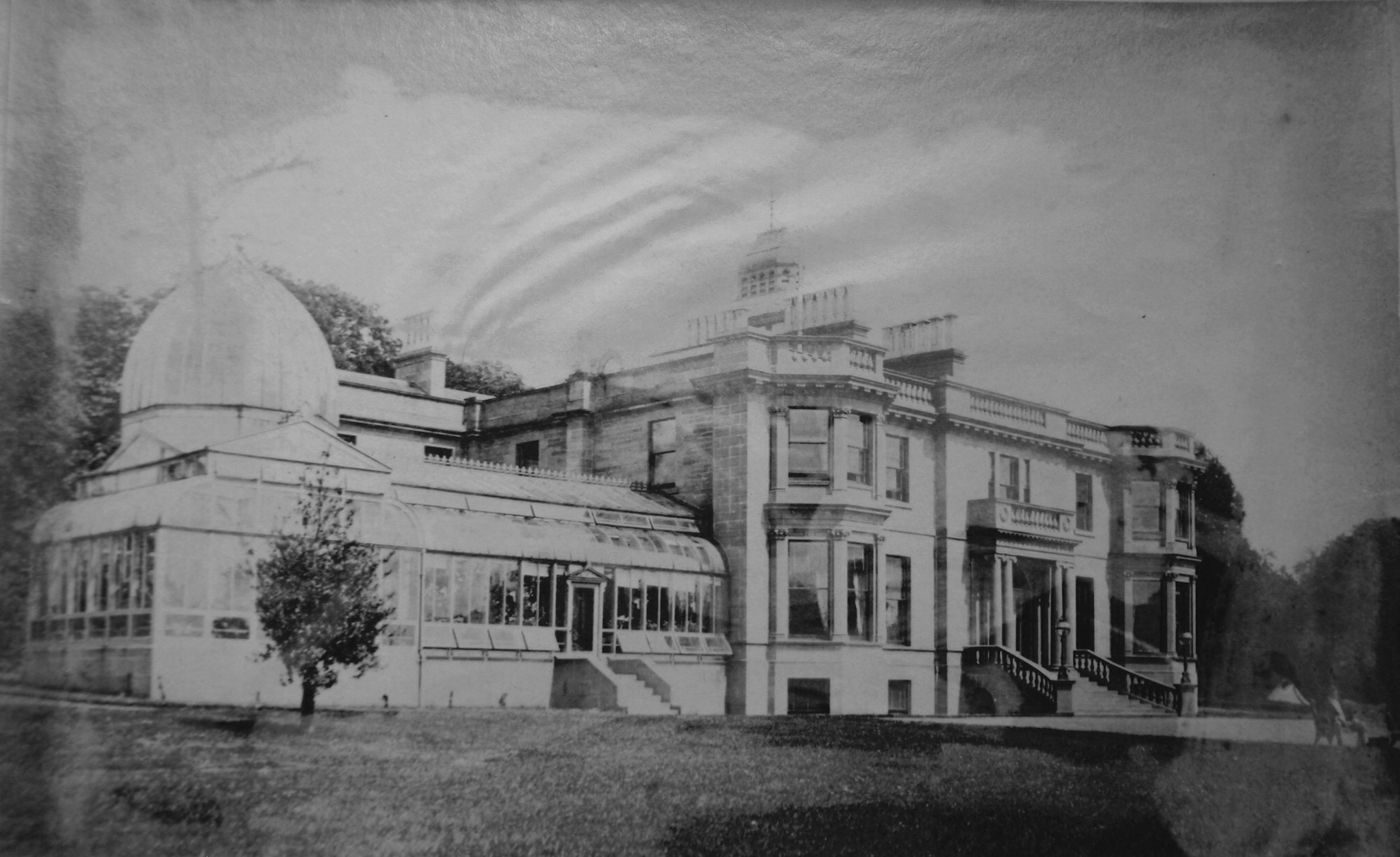
Balruddery House, circa 1884

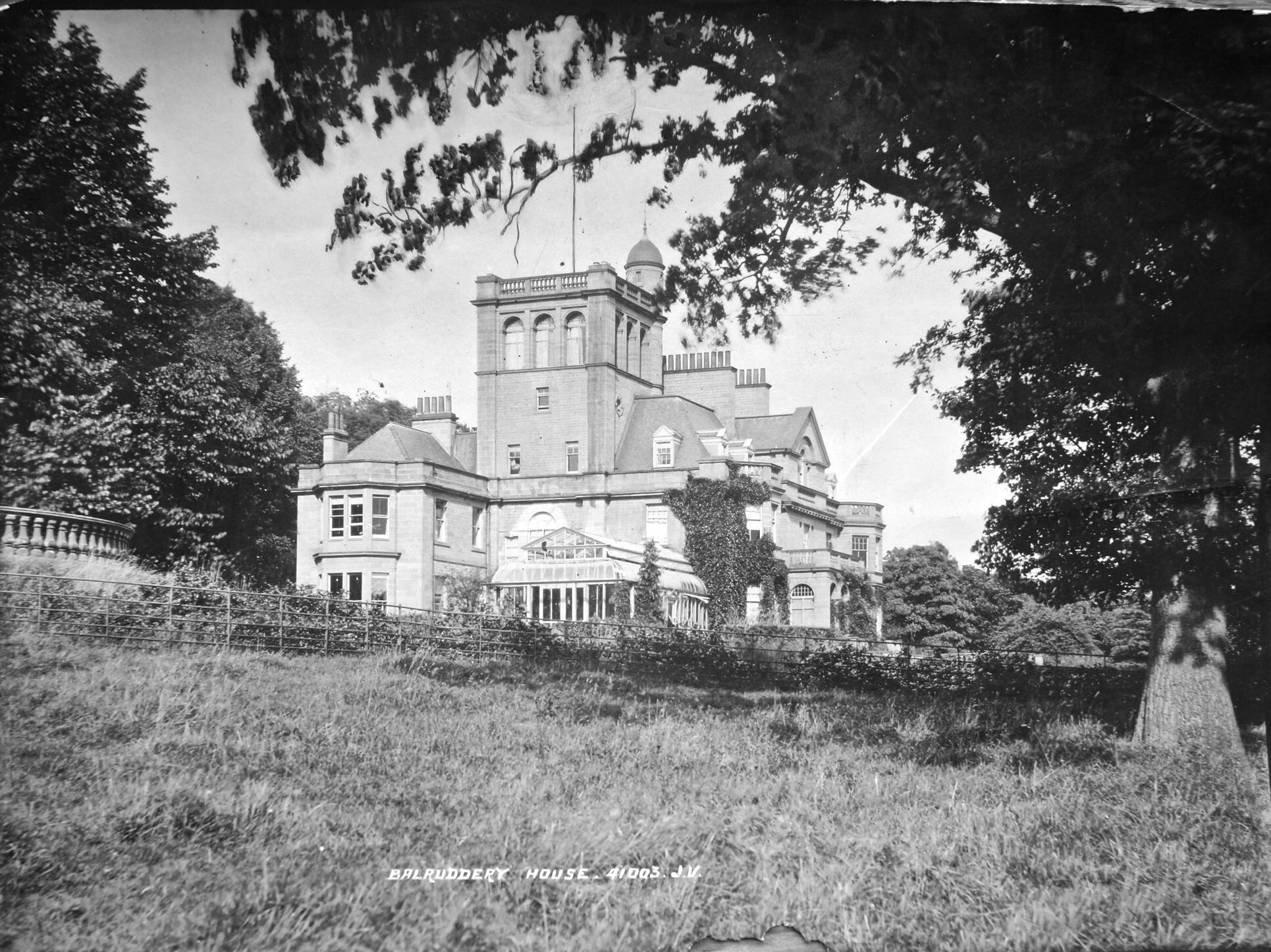
Balruddery House as rebuilt after the fire, circa 1920s

In 1886 a fire destroyed much of the house and it was rebuilt by Sidney Mitchell for Martin White, his father having died in 1884. Martin was very interested in the organ and had an electronic organ by Robert Hope-Jones installed in the central hall of the new house, making the house nearly impossible to heat effectively.

In 1901 a curling pond and linked clubhouse were added, the latter being designed by Patrick Thoms.

When Martin died in 1928, his son Oliver White, chose not to live there and the house and a good portion of the contents, were sold to a cousin, Harold S Sharp. On his death in 1949, it passed to his wife and son, but was sold in 1961 to Eagle Star Insurance as a headquarters. Being found too large and impractical, it was again sold to someone else.

The walled garden remains, as do the stables, coach house, the old head gardener's house, now Wester Balruddery, the Inner West Lodge, and the East Gates. The coach house and stables have been converted to residential housing and are listed as are the east gates. The walled garden and surrounds now contain three or four modern houses, though until recently (2011) the remains of the foundation and heating system of the Victorian greenhouse could be seen, with camellias still growing on the wall; a line of tall scraggly yew trees marked the line of one of the former clipped ornamental yew hedges.

The main gardens contained three ponds, one ornamental, one for swimming and one for curling. The Balruddery Curling Club founded there is still in existence. A large Japanese stone lantern, brought back by Martin White from his honeymoon to Japan in 1898, remained standing after the destruction of the house for over 20 years, until it was acquired by Durham University Oriental Museum in 1985.

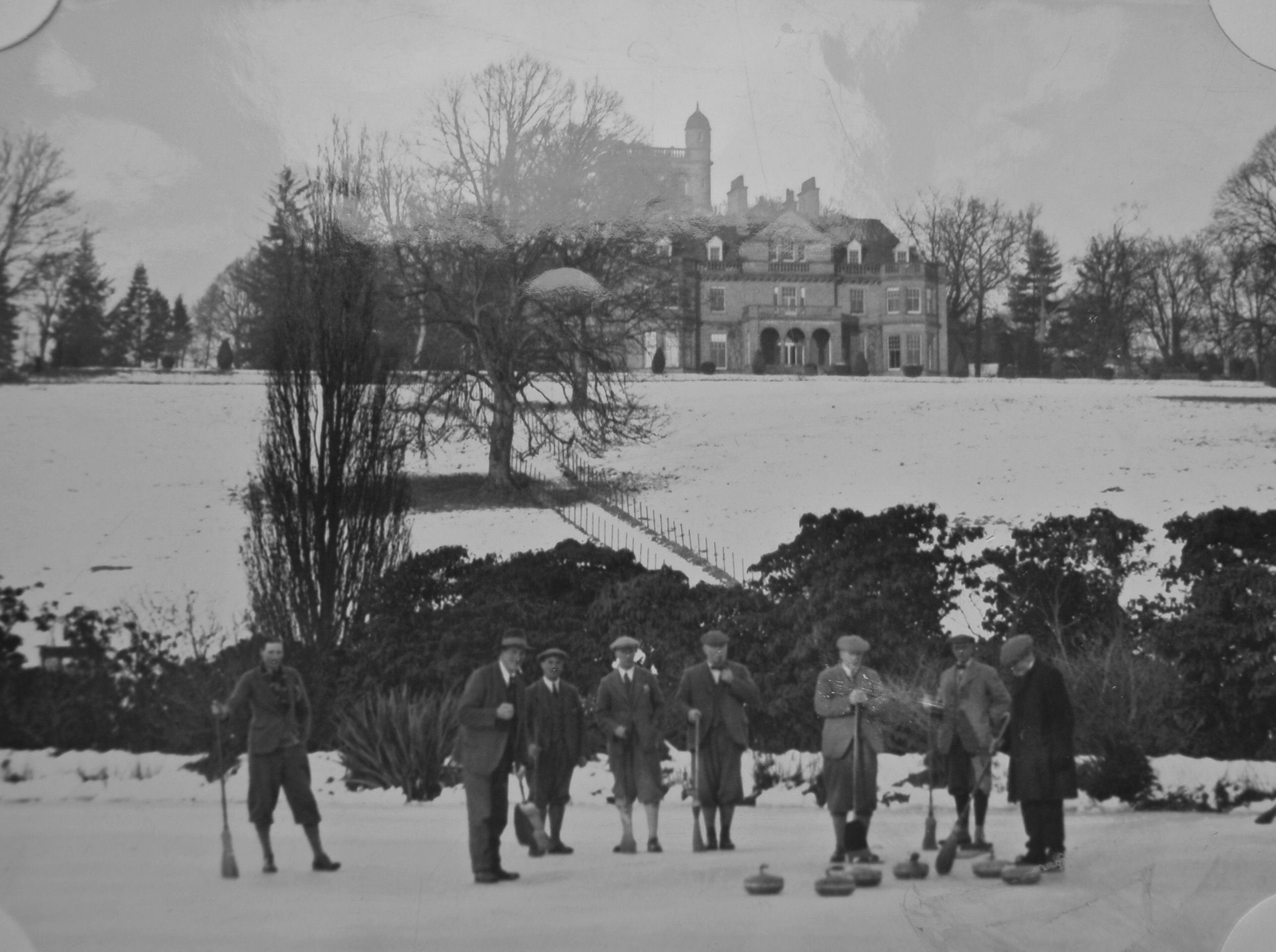
Curling at Balruddery House, circa 1930s

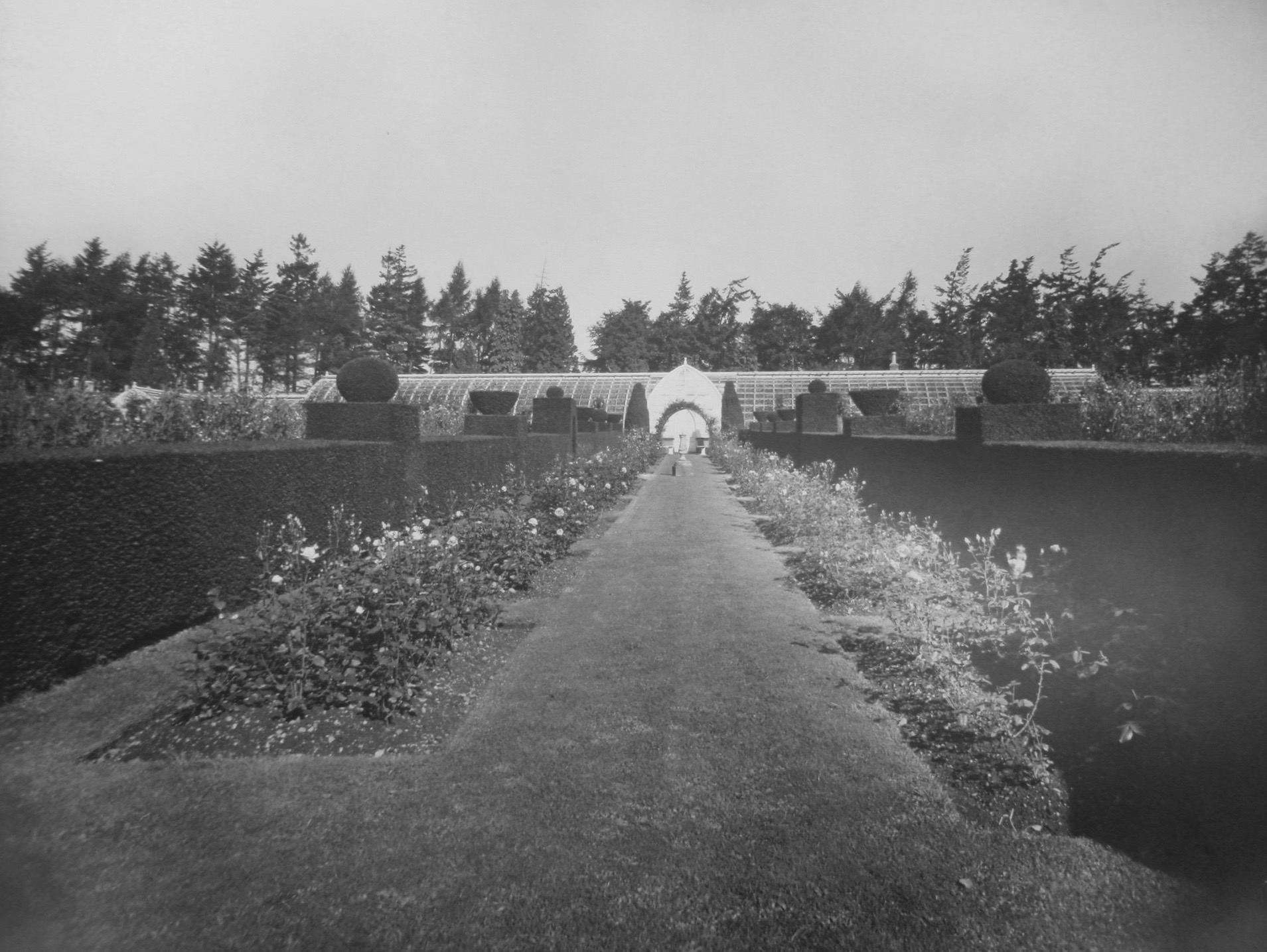
Walled garden and greenhouse at Balruddery, circa 1900
