= Alexander Cardew =

Indian politician

Sir Alexander Gordon Cardew KCSI
- Cardew in 1931

Governor of Madras (acting)
- In office 29 March 1919 – 10 April 1919
- Governor-General: Frederic Thesiger, 1st Viscount Chelmsford
- Preceded by: John Sinclair, 1st Baron Pentland
- Succeeded by: Freeman Freeman-Thomas, 1st Marquess of Willingdon

Member of the Executive Council of the Governor of Madras
- In office 1914–1919
- Governor: John Sinclair, 1st Baron Pentland

Personal details
- Born: 14 March 1861 Bath, Somerset, England
- Died: 12 January 1937 (aged 75) Kensington, London, England

Sir Alexander Gordon Cardew KCSI (14 March 1861 – 12 January 1937) was an Indian civil servant of British origin who served as the acting Governor of Madras from 29 March 1919 to 10 April 1919.

== Early life ==
Alexander Cardew was born in Bath, Somerset on 14 March 1861 the eldest son of the Reverend J.W. Cardew. He was educated at the Somersetshire College and The Queen's College, Oxford and entered the Indian Civil Service in 1881.

== India ==
Cardew served as an Under-Secretary in the Government of Madras from 1885 to 1890. Between 1892 and 1899 he was Inspector-General of Prison. He also served as a member of the Madras Legislative Council from 1906 to 1919 and in the Governor's Executive Council from 1914 to 1919.

== As Governor of Madras ==
Cardew served as the Acting Governor of Madras from 29 March 1919 to 10 April 1919.

== Family life ==
Cardew married Evelyn Roberta Firth in 1886 and they had two sons and two daughters.

Alexander Evelyn Cardew. Born 19 Nov 1888. BA Balliol 1913. Married Broadway Parish Church 6 July 1920 Gertrude Evelyn Staniforth daughter of Rev. Staniforth.

Margaret Isabel Cardew. Born March 1890. Married 9 Dec 1919 St James, Spanish Place, Captain Cuthbert Bellord RAF

Janet Cardew. Born September 1892.

Francis Mackay Cardew. Born 10 June 1904.

On 12 January 1937 he collapsed and died in the street in Kensington, London from a heart attack, aged 75.
