= 1906 Bodmin by-election =

UK parliamentary by-election

← 1906	24 July 1906	Jan. 1910 →

Candidate	Freeman-Thomas	Sandys
Party	Liberal	Liberal Unionist
Popular vote	4,969	3,876
Percentage	56.2%	43.8%
MP before election
Thomas Agar-Robartes
Liberal
Subsequent MP
Freeman-Thomas
Liberal

The 1906 Bodmin by-election was a by-election held on 24 July 1906 for the British House of Commons constituency of Bodmin in Cornwall.

== Vacancy ==
The by-election was triggered by the unseating of the town's Liberal Member of Parliament (MP) Thomas Agar-Robartes, as a result of an election petition alleging illegal payments to potential voters. The success of the petition was controversial, as the presiding Judge, Justice Grantham, himself a former Conservative MP, was already facing criticism for a decision on an election petition in the Great Yarmouth constituency which had been considered unduly favourable to the Conservatives. A censure motion was outstanding in Parliament at the time of the decision, but the Government decided not to proceed with it. Five years later, he was censured in Parliament by the then Prime Minister, H. H. Asquith, as a consequence of some comments to a jury in a case in Liverpool.

== Candidates ==
The Liberal candidate was Freeman Freeman-Thomas, who had lost his Hastings seat in the recent general election. The Liberal Unionist was George Sandys.

== Campaign ==
The brother of the unseated member toured the constituency, urging voters to avenge the result of the petition by voting Liberal. The Unionists alleged that the Government was planning to make up to 20,000 soldiers unemployed, a claim rejected by the Secretary of War, Richard Haldane.

== Result ==
The Liberal candidate won with a slightly reduced majority (down from 1,172 to 1,093) on a somewhat smaller turnout than at the general election.

Bodmin by-election, 1906
Party	Candidate	Votes	%	±%
Liberal	Freeman Freeman-Thomas	4,969	56.2	−0.1
Liberal Unionist	George Sandys	3,876	43.8	+0.1
Majority		1,093	12.4	−0.2
Turnout		8,845	82.4	−3.6
Liberal hold		Swing	-0.1	

== Aftermath ==
Sandys went on to become Conservative MP for Wells from 1910 to 1918, and his son Duncan Sandys later became an MP and cabinet minister.

== See also ==
- List of United Kingdom by-elections
- Bodmin constituency
