= James William Barclay =

Scottish businessman, farmer and politician

James William Barclay (1832 – 26 February 1907) was a Scottish businessman, farmer and politician. For nineteen years he was member of parliament for Forfarshire.

He was the son of George Barclay of Cults, near Aberdeen and his wife Margaret née Massie of Maryculter, Kincardineshire.

He was educated at Aberdeen Grammar School and the University of Aberdeen. He entered business as a manure merchant, and was also a major landowner and farmer. He farmed in Forfarshire, which had large amounts of grazing land for cattle. He was involved in the innovation of importing store cattle from the United States and Canada.

In 1864 Barclay was elected to the town council of the royal burgh of Aberdeen. He continued to a member until 1871, and was leader of the "Progressive" grouping, allied to the parliamentary Liberal Party, that controlled the council.

In June 1872 Colonel William Sykes, MP for Aberdeen died. Barclay was chosen as the official Liberal candidate. However, his reputation as a Radical led to a split in the local party, and John Farley Leith was also nominated as a "Moderate Liberal". In the event Leith was successful and Barclay was defeated.

In January 1874 a general election was called, and Barclay was nominated as Liberal candidate for the Forfarshire constituency. He was elected, and held the seat for the party at the 1880 and 1885 elections. He was described by the Marquess of Huntly as "a thick-set man of medium height, dark-haired and swarthy. He had the misfortune to speak through his nose with a twang, and was not a success in the House of Commons as a speaker".

In 1886 the Liberal Party split over the issue of Irish Home Rule and Barclay joined the break-away Liberal Unionist Party. At the ensuing general election he was returned as Unionist MP for Forfarshire. He was unseated at the next general election in 1892, when John Rigby regained the seat for the Liberals.

Barclay did not run for election again, but devoted himself to agriculture. In 1901 he purchased the Glenbuchat Estate, where he pioneered experiments in new scientific farming methods. He was also an enthusiastic supporter of the Aberdeen Agricultural College.

He was twice married. In 1863 he married Jane Smith of Strathdon, Aberdeenshire, who died in 1865. His second marriage was to Lilian Alice Novelli of London. He died in February 1907, aged 74, while on a visit to Nigeria.

Parliament of the United Kingdom
Preceded by Charles Carnegie	Member of Parliament for Forfarshire; 1874 – 1892	Succeeded by John Rigby
