= John Sinclair, 1st Baron Pentland =

British politician

The Right Honourable The Lord Pentland GCSI GCIE PC

Governor of Madras
- In office 30 October 1912 – 29 March 1919
- Governors-General: The Lord Hardinge of Penshurst; The Viscount Chelmsford
- Preceded by: Sir Murray Hammick (acting)
- Succeeded by: Sir Alexander Gordon Cardew (acting)

Secretary for Scotland
- In office 10 December 1905 – 13 February 1912
- Preceded by: The Marquess of Linlithgow
- Succeeded by: Thomas McKinnon Wood

Member of Parliament for Forfarshire
- In office 1897–1909
- Monarchs: Victoria of the United Kingdom, Edward VII of the United Kingdom
- Preceded by: Martin White
- Succeeded by: James Falconer

Member of Parliament for Dunbartonshire
- In office 1892–1895
- Monarch: Victoria of the United Kingdom
- Preceded by: Sir Archibald Orr-Ewing, 1st Baronet
- Succeeded by: Alexander Wylie

Personal details
- Born: 7 July 1860
- Died: 11 January 1925 (aged 64) United Kingdom
- Party: Liberal Party
- Spouse: Marjorie Adeline Gordon

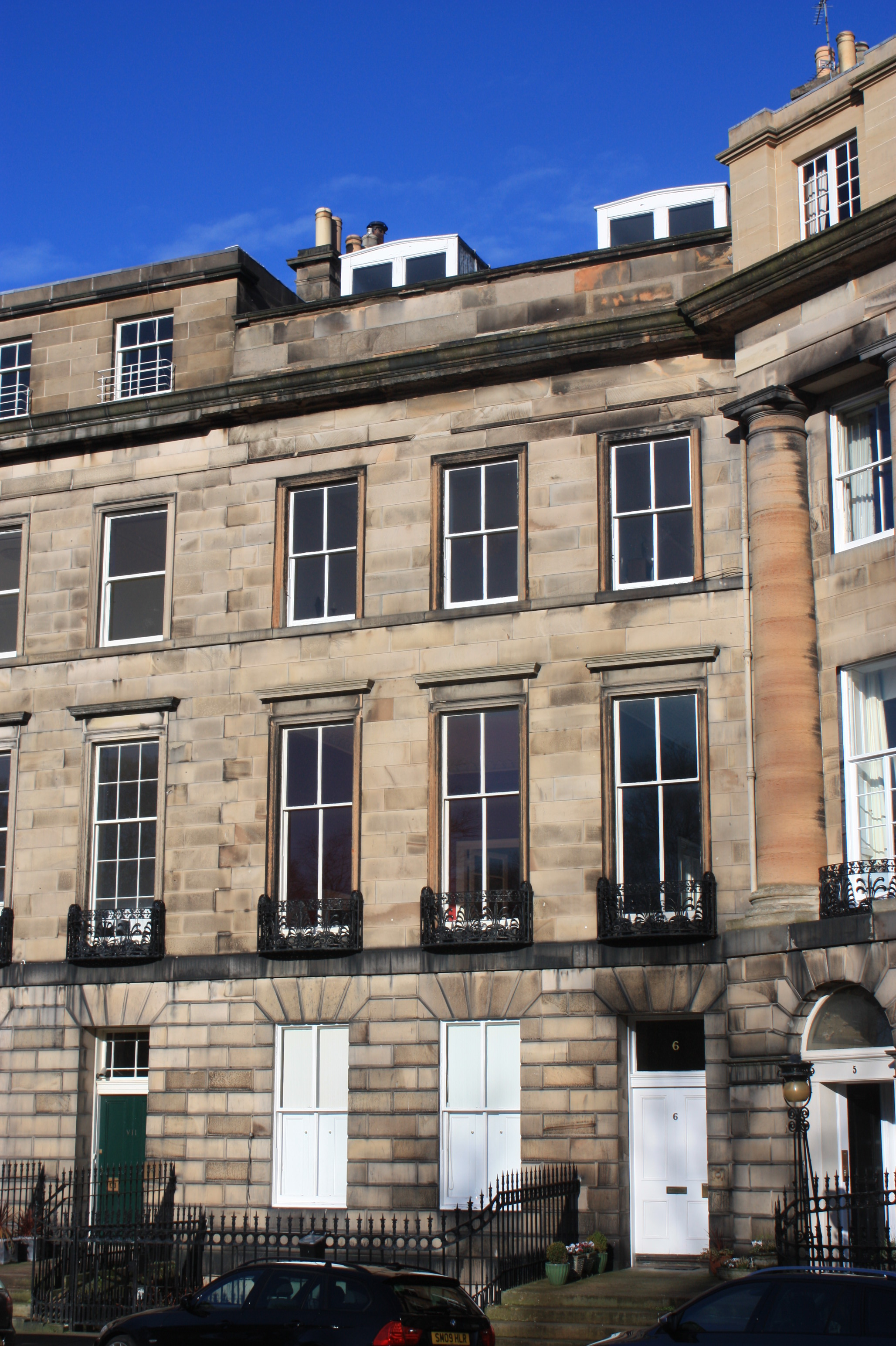
6 Moray Place, Edinburgh, birthplace of John Sinclair

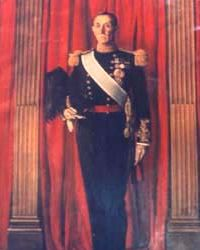
Baron Pentland

John Sinclair, 1st Baron Pentland, GCSI, GCIE, PC (7 July 1860 – 11 January 1925) was a British politician in the Scottish Liberal Party, a soldier, peer, administrator and Privy Councillor who served as the Secretary of Scotland from 1905 to 1912 and the Governor of Madras from 1912 to 1919.

Baron Pentland was born John Sinclair to George Sinclair (1826-1871) son of Sir John Sinclair, 6th baronet of Dunbeath. He studied in the United Kingdom and in 1892, entered the House of Commons as an elected Member of Parliament (MP) for Dunbartonshire. He was elected for a second term from Forfar in 1897 and served in the British Parliament from 1892 to 1895 and 1897 to 1909. He also served as an Aide-de-Camp and secretary to Lord Aberdeen. Sinclair was appointed to the Privy Council in 1905. He served as the Secretary for Scotland from 1905 to 1912 and as the Governor of Madras from 1912 to 1919. He died in 1925.

During his tenure as Governor of Madras, Pentland became popular in India for the interest he showed in the indigenous tradition and culture. At the same time, he is also remembered for his crackdown on Annie Besant and leaders of the Home Rule Movement.

A radical Liberal, Sinclair was supportive of reforms aimed at promoting social justice. As noted by Veronica Strong-Boag

"As much as anyone in the new Cabinet after the 1905 election, he embodied the new liberalism of state intervention on the side of the weak. He was also a staunch proponent of legislation tailored to Scottish circumstances. His advocacy of the Education (Scotland) Act 1908 (8 Edw. 7. c. 63), which provided for improved teacher training and school facilities and meals for students, very much followed the spirit of Lord Aberdeen’s practices on his own estates. So, too, did Sinclair’s support for legislation to secure the land rights of Scottish crofters."

== Early life and ancestry ==
John Sinclair was born at 6 Moray Place, Edinburgh to Captain John Sinclair (1826–1871), an officer in the Bengal Army and Agnes Sinclair, daughter of John Learmonth of Dean who constructed the Dean Bridge of Edinburgh, on 7 July 1860. John Sinclair was the eldest of three sons.

Captain John Sinclair of Lyth was the grandson of Sir John Sinclair of Barrock, 6th baronet of Dunbeath, and descended from George Sinclair of Mey (himself third son of the 4th Earl of Caithness), who died 1616. He was thus a distant cousin of the contemporary Earls of Caithness who were descended from the 7th Baronet, of Mey.

== Education and military career ==
Sinclair was educated at Edinburgh Academy and Wellington College. He left Wellington in 1878 and the next year passed out fifth from the Royal Military College, Sandhurst. On completion of the one-year Sandhurst course, Sinclair was commissioned into the 5th Royal Irish Lancers. He served in the Sudan expedition and returned as captain in 1887.

== Early political career ==
Sinclair participated in political activities from an early age. He was among those who moved to Toynbee Hall along with Samuel Augustus Barnett, where he strived to promote education and sport, and was one of the founders of the London Playing Fields Society, a sports ground established for the sake of the poor.

Sinclair joined the Liberal Party in the 1880s and contested elections to the House of Commons from the Ayr Burghs in Scotland on the promise of Home Rule for Ireland, but lost.

Pentland served as Aide-de-Camp and Official Secretary to Lord Aberdeen while he was serving as Lord-Lieutenant of Ireland in 1886, and had the same roles in Canada while Lord Aberdeen was Governor-General there.

In January 1889 he was elected to the first London County Council as a Progressive councillor representing Finsbury East. He served a single three-year term, retiring from the council in 1892.

== Parliament of the United Kingdom ==
In 1892, Sinclair was elected a Liberal Member of Parliament for Dunbartonshire, a seat he held until 1895, and returned to the Commons representing Forfarshire from 1897 to 1909. He then acted as Parliamentary Secretary to Sir Henry Campbell-Bannerman for many years.

He was appointed a Privy Councillor on 11 December 1905 and was created Baron Pentland, of Lyth in the County of Caithness on 15 February 1909.

== Marriage and family ==
On 12 July 1904 he married Lady Marjorie Adeline Gordon, elder daughter of his former patron the 1st Marquess of Aberdeen and Temair.

They had two children

1. Henry John Sinclair, 2nd Baron Pentland, (b. 6 June 1907 d. 1984); succeeded his father 1925, also known as a former president of The Gurdjieff Foundation of New York; married 11 September 1941 Lucy Elisabeth Smith; they had issue 1 daughter, who is married, and lives in New York.
2. Hon. Margaret Ishbel Sinclair (b. October 1906)

== As Secretary for Scotland ==
Pentland served as the Secretary for Scotland from 1905 to 1912. During his tenure, women's suffrage was introduced in the councils and Lavinia Malcolm was elected as provost of Dollar, Clackmannanshire, being both the first lady provost and first lady town councillor in Scotland. Numerous resolutions were passed to implement greater autonomy for Scotland but all of them failed when put to vote.

Pentland introduced the Taxation of Land Values (Scotland) Bill which recommended the creation of a new Board of Agriculture for Scotland to implement a sweeping land settlement programme. However, though the bill was approved by the House of Commons it was defeated by the House of Lords. A second government bill by Pentland was also defeated by the House of Lords.

Pentland was a favourite of the Prime Minister, Campbell-Bannerman. Pentland's Agriculture Act made the Secretary of Scotland answerable to the House of Commons for issues relating to agriculture. In 1907, he assured Scottish MPs in the House of Commons that the Government is aware of issues that plague Scotland.

Pentland was Secretary of State for Scotland during the Oscar Slater miscarriage of justice in 1909. Although he commuted Slater's death penalty to life imprisonment he did not investigate concerns, raised by many including Sir Arthur Conan Doyle, that the Glasgow Police, James Neil Hart (the Procurator Fiscal) and the Lord Advocate Ure conspired to protect the then influential Charteris and Birrell families of Glasgow. Slater's appeal was upheld in 1928.

In February 1912, Pentland retired as the Secretary for Scotland and was succeeded by Thomas McKinnon Wood.

== As Governor of Madras ==
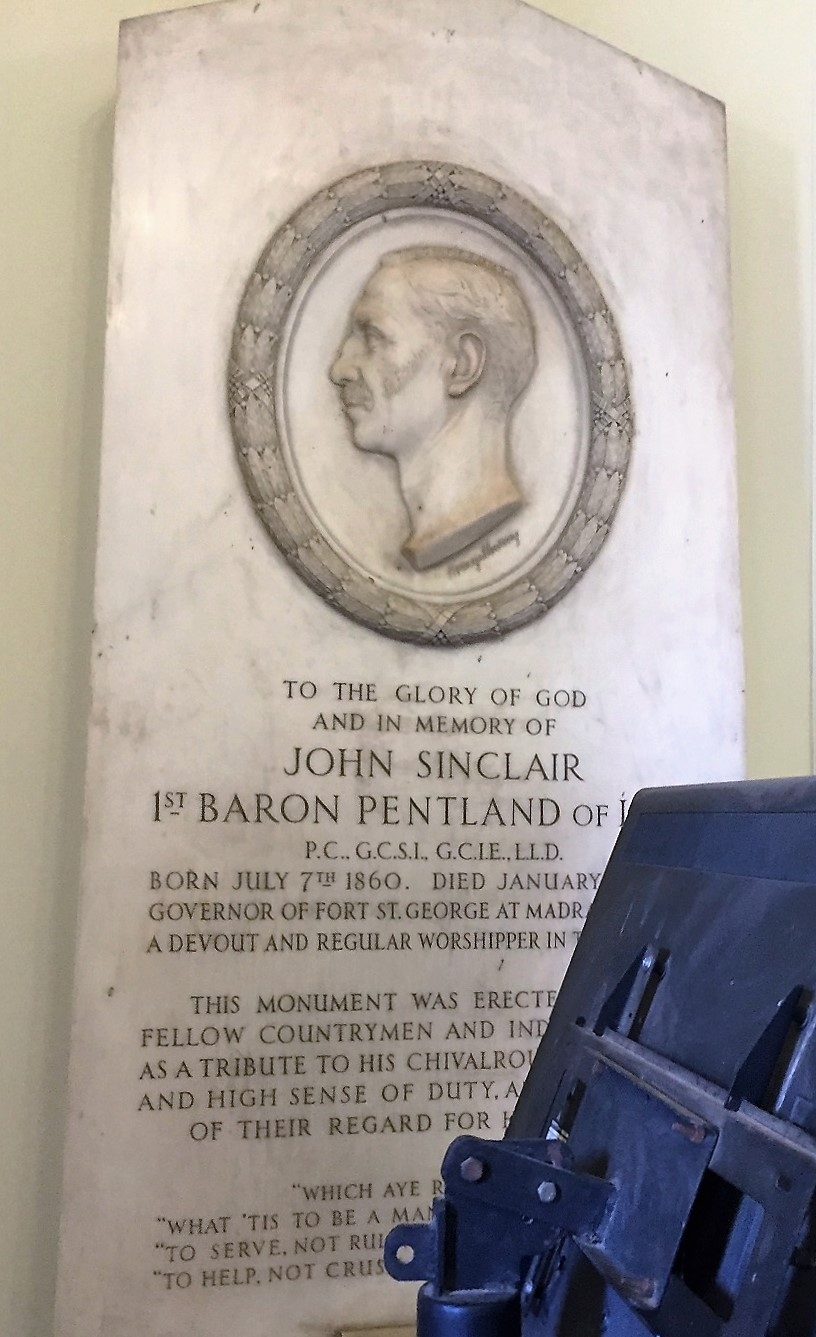
Memorial to John Sinclair, Baron Pentland, at the St Andrew's Kirk, Madras

Pentland served as the Governor of Madras from 1912 to 1919. For the most part of his tenure as Governor of Madras, British India was embroiled in the First World War.

=== Construction of the Pamban Bridge ===
In June 1911, Arthur Lawley had commissioned the construction of a railway bridge connecting Pamban Island with the Indian mainland. The existing railway line ended with the town of Ramanathapuram and it was felt that its extension to Pamban island would boost trade and tourism. It would also make it easier for pilgrims to travel to the sacred Hindu shrine of Rameswaram.

The construction of the 2.06 km long cantilever railway bridge was undertaken by the German engineer Scherzer and completed in 2 years at a cost of Rs. 2,000,000 by 600 workers with no loss of life. The bridge was opened by Lord Pentland for traffic on 24 February 1914. The Pamban bridge is India's largest sea bridge and an UNESCO World Heritage monument.

=== Pentland and Geddes ===
In 1914, Pentland invited the Scottish botanist and architect Patrick Geddes to conduct an exhibition on town-planning in Madras city. He reached Madras on 20 December 1914 after journeying overland from Calcutta through Vizagapatam, Guntur and Bellary. Pentland had been interacting with Geddes and was fascinated with his models since 1890.

Geddes had prepared for a detailed exhibition at Madras with a series of illustrations and maps. However, the ship by which they were slated to arrive in Madras, the "Clan Grant", was sunk to the south of Cape Comorin by the German ship Emden. This calamity delayed Geddes' visit to Madras by a couple of months and he had to recreate his presentations and illustrations.

The Cities and Town Planning Exhibition opened in the senate of the Madras University on 17 January 1915 and was inaugurated by the Governor who also gave an introductory speech. Patrick Geddes gave a detailed lecture on cost-effective town planning and sanitation with the aid of real-life examples and a presentation with detailed illustrations and maps.

Geddes spent the next few months in Madras touring the countryside and making reports and illustrations of the different towns in the Presidency. He persuaded Pentland to appoint a town planning advisor and suggested the name of H. V. Lancaster who was a vice-president of the Royal Institute of British Architects. Accordingly, in October 1915, Lancaster joined the service of the Madras government.

=== During the First World War ===
Pentland set up a hospital ship which plied regularly between Africa and India and then, between India and the Middle East, caring for sailors injured at sea and treating them. This hospital ship was paid for and maintained by some of the prominent citizens of Madras.

In 1914, the Department of Industries, which had earlier been disbanded in face of protests from the Madras Chamber of Commerce, was re-established. This department commenced the rapid industrialization of the province to cater to the economic and industrialization needs of the war. Factories manufacturing soap, ink, adhesives, paper-making, oil-pressing, food processing and decoration of groundnuts were established all over the province. Industries were set for manufacturing military equipment for the British army.

Shelling of Madras by SMS Emden

On 22 September 1914, the German cruiser Emden which was patrolling the Bay of Bengal launched a surprise attack on Madras shelling the oil tanks of the Burmah Oil Company that we set up on the shore. Five tanks were hit out of which two caught fire. Nearly, 425,000 gallons of oil were lost in the attack. Three Indians were killed and the Indian liner Chupra was damaged in the attack. The battle lasted fifteen minutes and Emden sailed away towards Pondicherry when the coastal defenses of Madras started to retaliate.

Though the casualties due to the attack were minimal, there was a great deal of material damage caused by the shelling. The people of Madras were terrified by these attacks that SMS Emden has carved out a place for itself in local folklore.

Home Rule Movement

In 1915, the Home Rule Movement was started in order to demand home rule for India. In Madras, it was led by Irishwoman Annie Besant and Sir S. Subramania Iyer. As the movement gathered strength, Pentland responded with Annie Besant's arrest in June 1917 for hoisting the provisional flag of free India and a crackdown on the leaders of the movement. Other freedom-fighter as George Arundale and B. P. Wadia were subsequently arrested. These arrests were strongly condemned and her case argued by Mohammad Ali Jinnah.

=== Pentland and Rameswaram ===
Lord and Lady Pentland were deeply interested in Hindu religion and philosophy. He appeared captivated by the Hindu shrine at Rameswaram which he visited during the inauguration of Pamban Bridge and recommended to the Viceroy to establish a committee to conduct a detailed undersea exploration at the site.

For me Rameshwaram, very much like India as a whole is the real world. We English men live in a mad house of abstractions. Vital life in Rameshwaram has not yet withdrawn into the capsule of the head. It is the whole body that lives. No wonder the English man feels dreamlike: the complete life of Rameshwaram is something of which he merely dreams. ... I did not see an English man in India who really lived there. They are all living in England, that is, in a sort of bottle filled with English air.... History can be events or memory of events. ... along the Bay of Bengal the Madras Presidency runs, with the well-governed city of Madras at its center and the sublime and glorious temples of Tanjore, Tiruchi, Madurai and Rameshwaram adorning its Southern boundaries. And then Adam’s Bridge- a reef of sunken islands' beckons us across the Palk Straits to Ceylon, where civilization flourished more than 2000 years ago. ... Linga stones may be seen in many places on the highways in my Presidency. Hindus break upon them the coconuts which they are about to offer in sacrifice. Usually the phallic ritual is simple and becoming; it consists in anointing the stone with consecrated water or oil, and decorating it with leaves. At the Rameshwaram temple, the Linga stone is daily washed with Ganga water, which is afterwards sold to the pious, as holy water or mesmerized water has been sold in Europe. All these are a little part of my beloved Presidency – indeed my favourite India. Right from the dawn of history, India is extraordinarily continuous in time. In space, on the other hand, it is extraordinarily discontinuous. ... from early times in India, it is ethnology, philology, and archaeology that give and will give us some notions of the truth. From archaeology much can be expected. I would earnestly request you to direct the Archaeological Survey of India (ASI) to undertake an extensive and intensive survey of Rameshwaram and its beautiful environs, particularly with reference to the historic and primordial Adam’s Bridge

— John Sinclair, Letter to Viceroy of India, Lord Hardinge, 1 December 1914.

=== Pentland's policy ===
Pentland was one of the classical British Indian politicians who shared their views on appeasing Indians and that words were more important than actions. The half-measures at industrial development were primarily undertaken to sustain the wartime economy of the First World War. In 1917, he is believed to have told Edwin Samuel Montagu, the Secretary of State for India:

We ought to play with them (Indians), humour them in politics and discuss with them industrial development, education and social reform; but there is no necessity for doing anything

Lord Pentland is also remembered for having assisted the Indian mathematician Srinivasa Ramanujan make his journey to England.

On the general poverty of the masses, Pentland remarked that laborers of Madras city had the habit of frequenting cinema halls to watch movies and suggested that this could be one of the possible reasons for their poverty. Pentland's statement also hints at the possibility of a drastic increase in the number of cinema goers during his Governorate.

== Death ==
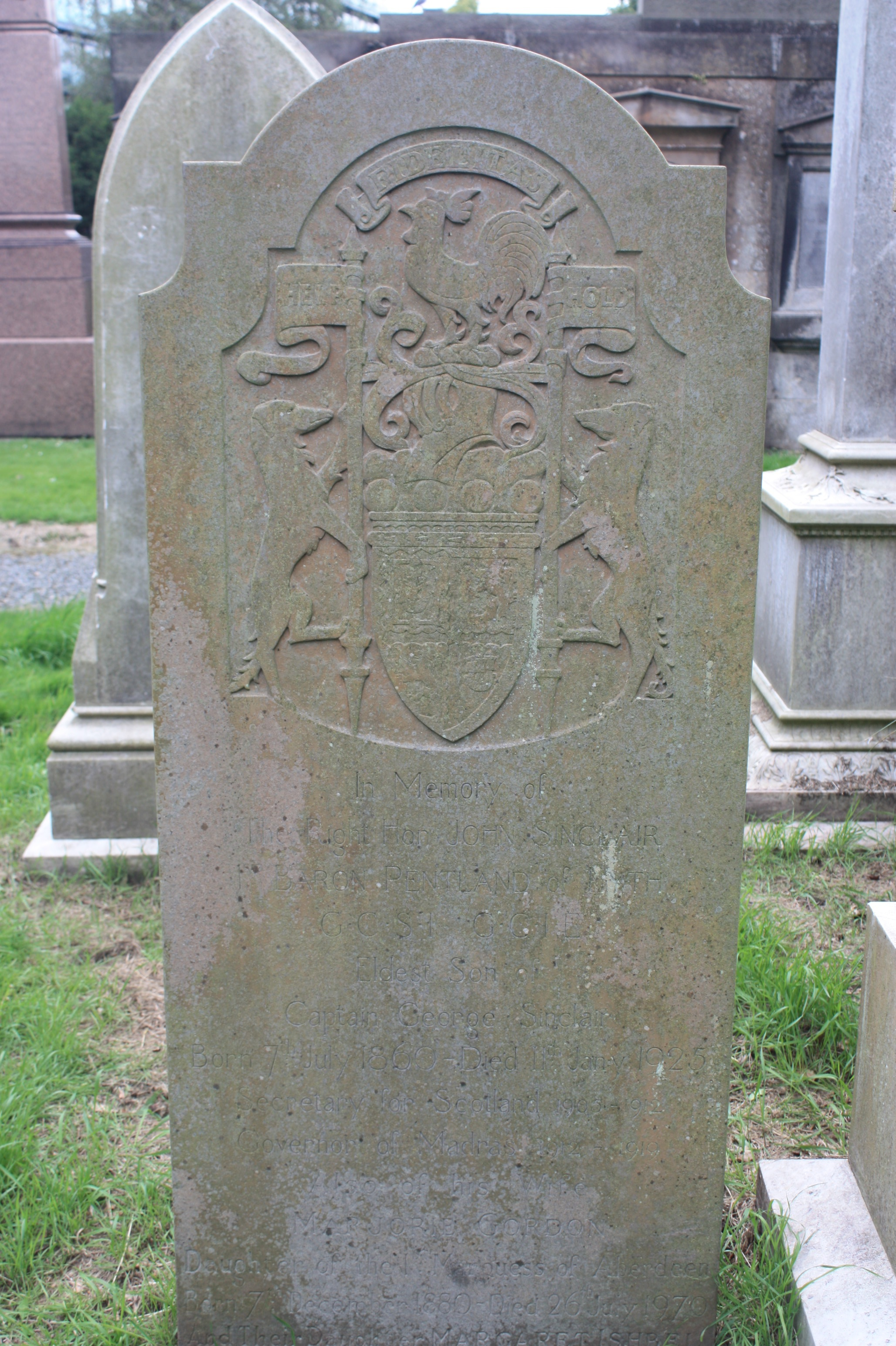
the modest grave of John Sinclair, Baron Pentland, Dean Cemetery

John Sinclair died in 1925, and was succeeded to the barony by his son.

He is buried in Dean Cemetery in Edinburgh, with a humble grave, set back from the path behind other stones. It lies in the north-west section of the original cemetery.

== Honours and Arms ==
Pentland was made a Knight Grand Commander of the Order of the Indian Empire in 1912 and a Knight Grand Commander of the Order of the Star of India in 1918.

=== Arms ===
Coat of arms of John Sinclair, 1st Baron Pentland
Crest A cock proper. Escutcheon Quarterly: 1st, azure, a ship at anchor, oars in saltire or, flagged gules, within a double tressure counter-flory of the second; 2nd and 3rd, or, a lion rampant gules, armed and langued azure; 4th, azure, a ship under sail or, sails argent and flags gules; over all, dividing the four quarters, a cross engrailed sable, thereon a mullet for difference, Sinclair; the whole within a bordure parted per pale, the dexter side indented gules, the sinister ermine. Supporters On either side a Scotch deerhound proper, each supporting a banner azure, that to the dexter inscribed with the word "HELP" and that to the sinister with the word a"HOLD" Motto Fidelitas (Fidelity)

== Sources ==
- Biography of Lord Aberdeen, father-in-law to Lord Pentland
- Descendants of Mary Tudor, Princess of England, Queen of France
- Some Sinclair peers
- Sir John Sinclair of Barrock, 6th Bt, of Dunbeath is Lord Pentland's ancestor
- Torrance, David, The Scottish Secretaries (Birlinn 2006)

Parliament of the United Kingdom
Preceded by Sir Archibald Orr-Ewing	Member of Parliament for Dunbartonshire; 1892–1895	Succeeded by Alexander Wylie
Preceded by Martin White	Member of Parliament for Forfarshire; 1897–1909	Succeeded by James Falconer
Political offices
Preceded by Marquess of Linlithgow	Secretary for Scotland; 1905–1912	Succeeded by Thomas McKinnon Wood
Preceded by Sir Murray Hammick (acting)	Governor of Madras Presidency; 30 October 1912 – 29 March 1919	Succeeded by Alexander Cardew
Peerage of the United Kingdom
New creation	Baron Pentland; 1909–1925	Succeeded by Henry John Sinclair
