= John Rigby (politician) =

British judge and Liberal politician

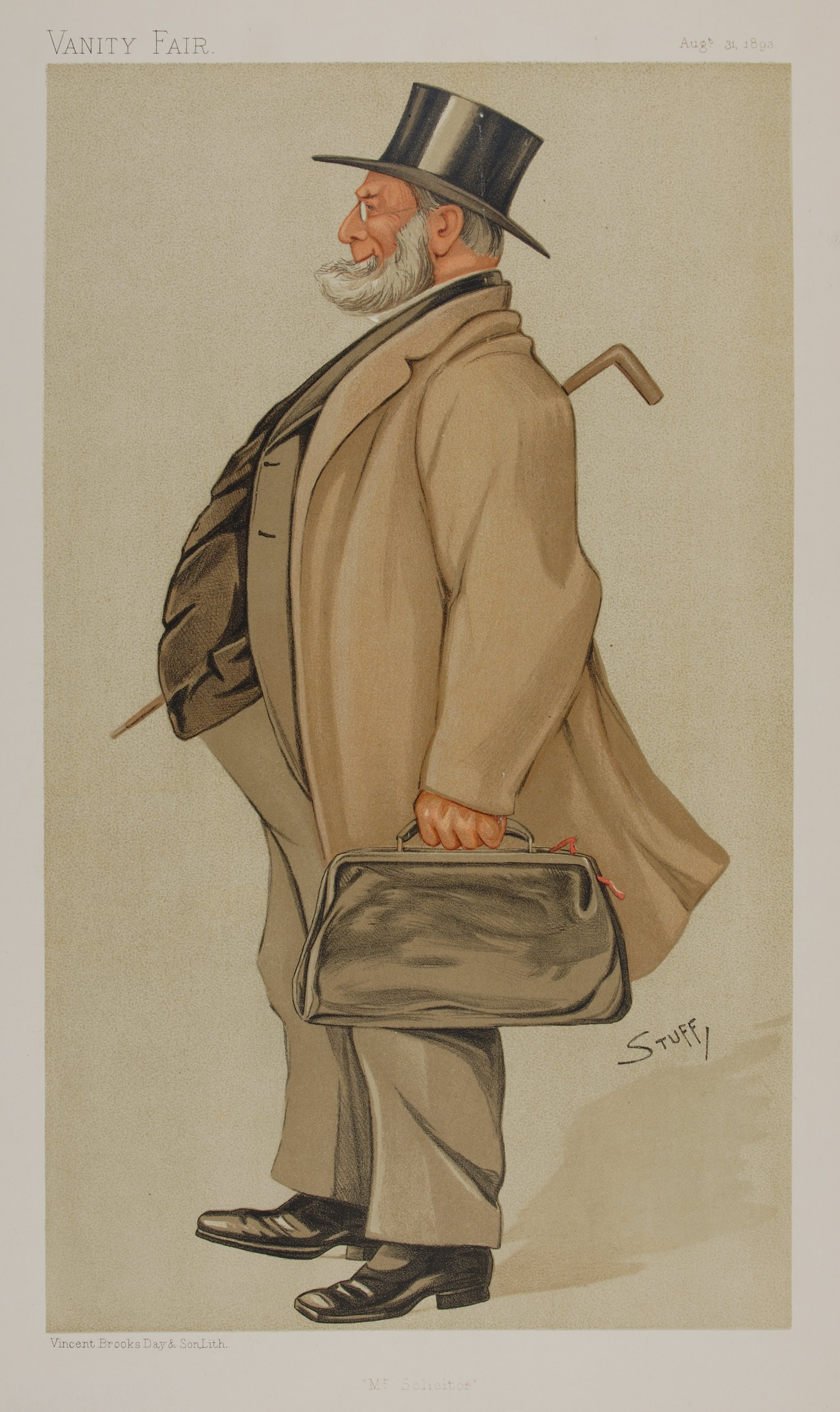
"Mr Solicitor" As caricatured in Vanity Fair, 31 August 1893

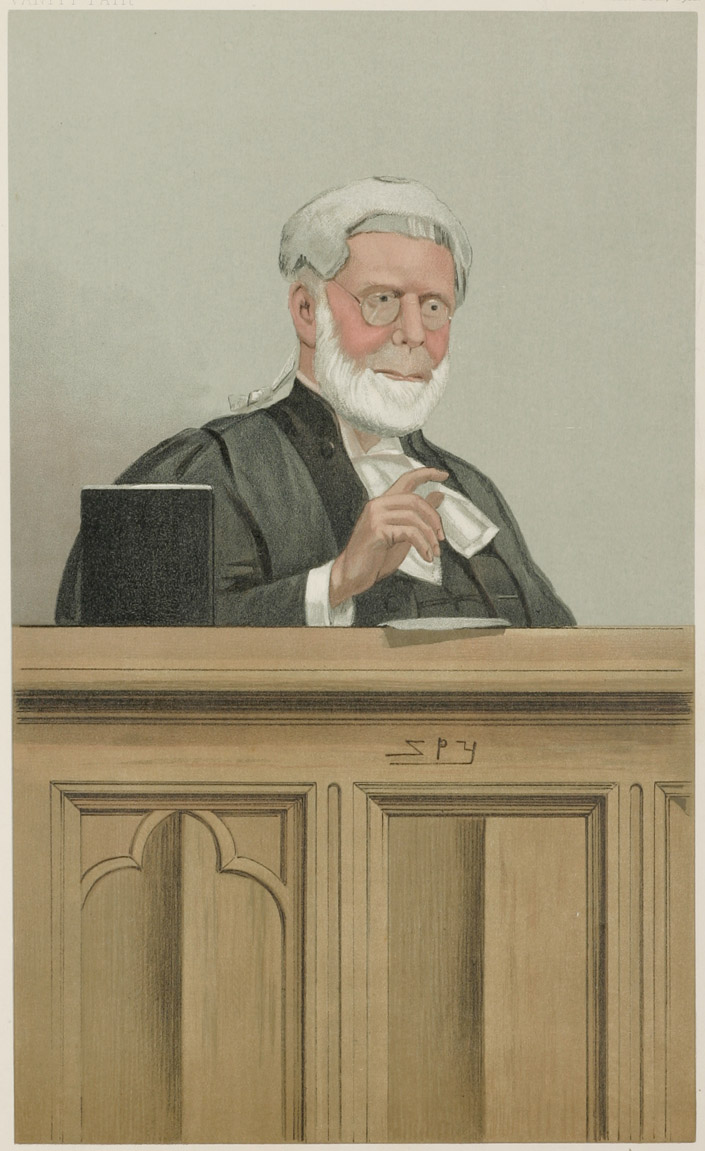
"a blunt Lord Justice" As caricatured by Spy (Leslie Ward) in Vanity Fair, March 1901

Sir John Rigby, PC (8 January 1834 – 26 July 1903), was a British judge and Liberal politician who sat in the House of Commons between 1885 and 1894.

== Background and education ==
Rigby was born in Runcorn, Cheshire, the son of Thomas Rigby of Halton, Cheshire, and his wife Elizabeth Kendal. He attended Liverpool College before going to Trinity College, Cambridge in 1853. He graduated as Second Wrangler in 1856, also being placed second for the Smith's Prize. He became a fellow of Trinity in 1856 and was called to the Bar at Lincoln's Inn in 1860.

== Legal career ==
The story of how Rigby came to the Bar may be found on pg. 120 of the 1958 memoir “B-berry and I Look Back”, by Dornford Yates. In 1875 Rigby was appointed junior counsel to the Treasury. In 1881 he "took silk", becoming a Queen's Counsel. He distinguished himself as an advocate, and was frequently involved in bringing appeals to the judicial committee of the House of Lords. Rigby was twice briefly a Liberal Party Member of Parliament. He was elected as MP for the Wisbech division of Cambridgeshire at the 1885 general election, but lost the seat when another election was held in 1886.

In 1892 Rigby returned to parliament, when he was among a number of Liberals who gained seats from the government parties in Scotland. He was elected at Forfarshire, unseating the Liberal Unionist, James Barclay. He was appointed Solicitor General for England and Wales in William Gladstone's new government, and received a knighthood on 26 November 1892. On 3 May 1894 Rigby became Attorney General for England and Wales.

On 19 October 1894 he vacated his Commons seat when he was appointed a Lord Justice of Appeal, in succession to Sir Horace Davey. He was sworn of the Privy Council at the same time. He served on the Court of Appeal until his retirement in 1901, when he was granted an annuity of £3,500.

=== Judgments ===
- The Satanita [1897] AC 59 - Contract law case atypical of the conventional offer & acceptance pattern seen in English law. Rigby's decision at appeal affirmed by the House of Lords.

== Personal life ==
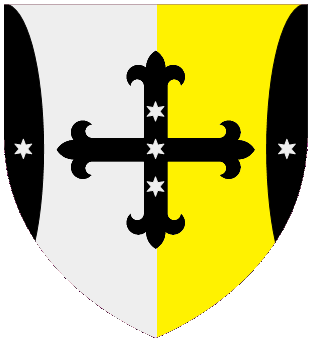
Shield of arms

A few years before his retirement, Rigby had suffered a severe fall, and never fully recovered his health. He died aged 69, unmarried, at his home at Chelsea Embankment, London in July 1903.

Parliament of the United Kingdom
New constituency	Member of Parliament for Wisbech; 1885 – 1886	Succeeded by Charles William Selwyn
Preceded by James William Barclay	Member of Parliament for Forfarshire; 1892 – 1894	Succeeded by Charles Maule Ramsay
Legal offices
Preceded by Sir Edward Clarke	Solicitor General; 1892–1894	Succeeded by Sir Robert Reid
Preceded by Sir Charles Russell	Attorney General; 1894	Succeeded by Sir Robert Reid
