= Robert Blackburn, Lord Blackburn =

Scottish lawyer

Robert Francis Leslie Blackburn, Lord Blackburn (1864–1944) was a Scottish lawyer and Senator of the College of Justice.

== Life ==
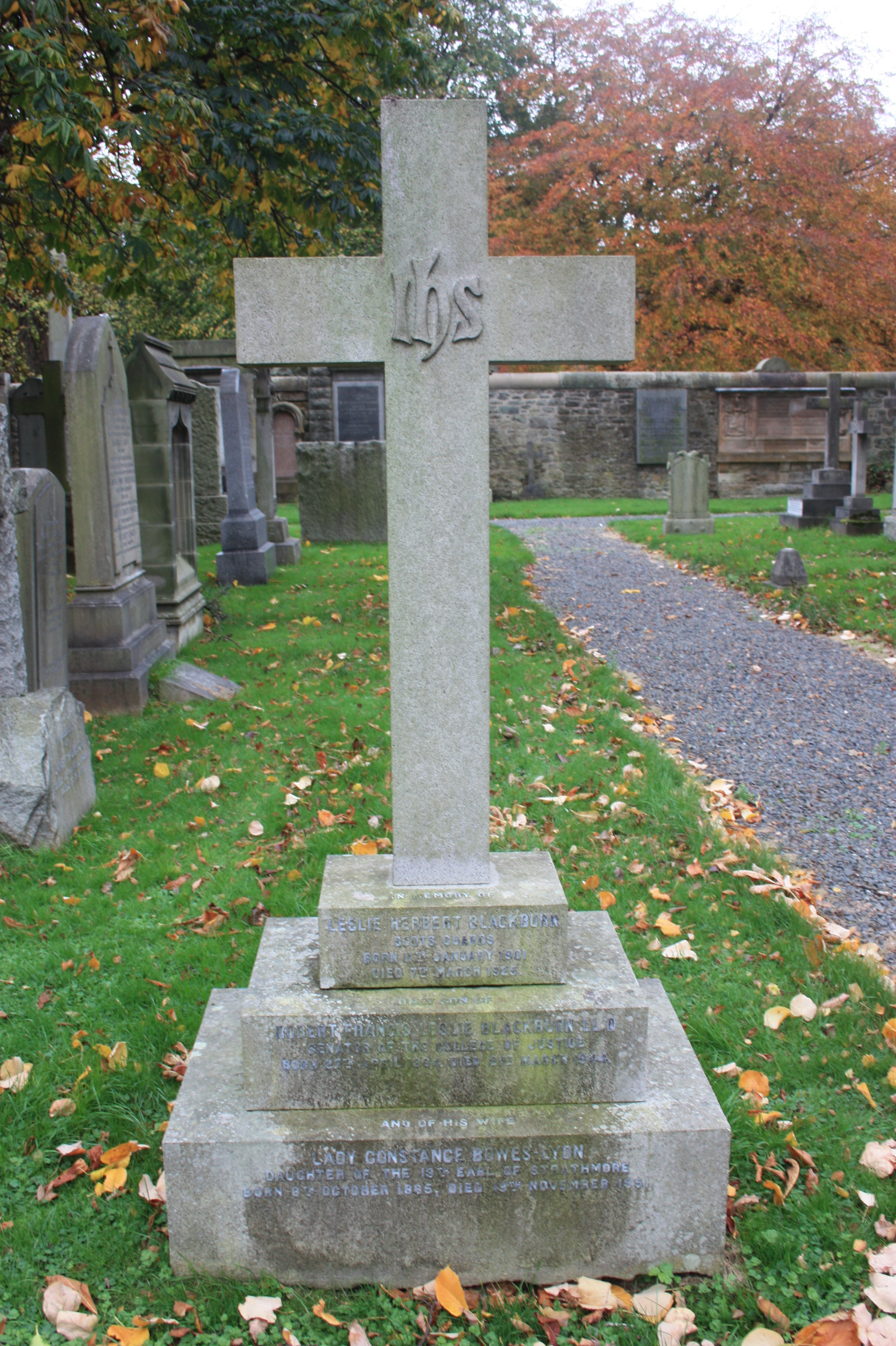
The grave of Lord Blackburn, Dean Cemetery, Edinburgh

He was born in Selkirk on 27 April 1864, the son of Robert Bogle Blackburn and his wife Frances Georgina.

He was a Lord of Session from 1918 to 1935 replacing Henry Johnston, Lord Johnston as a Senator of the College of Justice. His position as a Senator of the College of Justice was filled in 1935 by Douglas Jamieson, Lord Jamieson.

He died in Blairgowrie on 21 March 1944 but is buried with his wife in Dean Cemetery in western Edinburgh. The grave lies in the northern extension on the corner of the north path with one of the north–south paths.

== Family ==
He married Lady Constance Frances Bowes-Lyon, daughter of Claude Bowes-Lyon, 13th Earl of Strathmore and Kinghorne. She was aunt to Elizabeth Bowes-Lyon (the Queen Mother) and great aunt to Queen Elizabeth II.

They had four children. Three daughters and a son Leslie Francis Blackburn of the Scots Guards (1901-1925).
