= Listed buildings in Padiham =

Padiham is a town and a civil parish in the borough of Burnley, Lancashire, England. The parish contains 29 buildings that are recorded in the National Heritage List for England as designated listed buildings. Of these, two are listed at Grade II*, the middle grade, and the others are at Grade II, the lowest grade. The parish consists of the town of Padiham and surrounding countryside.

At first Padiham was a market town, but following the Industrial Revolution a number of cotton mills were built. Most of the older listed buildings are farmhouses and farm buildings. The later listed buildings include houses, some of them in rows, churches and associated structures, a lodge at the entrance of a drive to Gawthorpe Hall, banks, a former school master's house, the town hall, and township boundary stones.

== Key ==
Grade	Criteria
II*	Particularly important buildings of more than special interest
II	Buildings of national importance and special interest

== Buildings ==
Name and location	Photograph	Date	Notes	Grade
Green Farmhouse and Cottage; 53.79714°N 2.31402°W		Early 17th century	Originally one house, later divided into two, consisting of a hall and a cross-wing. The building is in sandstone, with two storeys. The hall has a roof of concrete tiles, and the cross-wing is roofed with stone-slates. The windows in the cross-wing are mullioned, and those in the front of the hall have been replaced. Inside the hall, in the upper floor, is a timber-framed partition.	II
Hargrove Farmhouse; 53.80948°N 2.31021°W		Early to mid 17th century	A farmhouse later extended and divided into two dwellings, it is in sandstone with stone-slate roofs, and has two storeys. The original block has three bays with a gabled cross wing on the right, and another wing was added later to the rear of this at a right angle. The doorway has a Tudor arched lintel. All the windows are mullioned, and one also has transoms.	II*
Cellar Restaurant; 53.80188°N 2.31658°W		17th century	Originally a public house, it was refronted in the 19th century and has since been used as a restaurant. The building is stuccoed with sandstone dressings and a stone flagged roof. It has two storeys and a three-bay front, the outer bays being gabled. The windows are mullioned.	II
Stockbridge House; 53.79805°N 2.30753°W		Mid 17th century	A house with an L-shaped plan, consisting of a hall and a cross-wing. It is in sandstone and has a roof of concrete tiles. On the garden front is a sundial dated 1829. The windows are mullioned or mullioned and transomed.	II*
Higher Slade House; 53.80963°N 2.31893°W	—	Late 17th century	A sandstone farmhouse with a stone-slate roof and stone ridge tiles. It has two storeys with a central doorway dating from the 19th century. The windows are mullioned.	II
Lower Fenny Fold Farmhouse; 53.79158°N 2.32159°W		1759	The farmhouse was extended in the 18th century. It is in sandstone with stone-slate roofs. The original part has two storeys and two bays, with a two-storey extension and a single-storey outshut. Some of the windows are mullioned.	II
Craggs Farmhouse; 53.80025°N 2.32453°W		Late 18th century (probable)	The oldest part is the side wing, with the main block dating from about 1840. The house is in sandstone with stone-slate roofs, and has two storeys. The main block is symmetrical with a central doorway flanked by mullioned windows in the ground floor and with casements above.	II
Barn and stable, Craggs Farm; 53.80054°N 2.32464°W		1777	The stable was added to the barn later at the northwest corner. The barn is in sandstone with a stone-slate roof, in a single tall storey and three bays. It has a central wagon entrance under a segmental arch with a dated keystone. Elsewhere are doorways, another wagon entrance, and casement windows.	II
Arbory Lodge; 53.80260°N 2.32423°W		c. 1800	This was originally the gateway to the Huntroyde Demesne, and has a 20th-century extension. It is in sandstone with a slate roof, and consists of two lodges, each in a diamond plan, flanking an archway. The lodges are similar, containing a doorway, round windows, and turrets at the corners. The arch is two-centred, and contains wrought iron gates. The lodges and archway are battlemented.	II
2 Factory Lane; 53.80231°N 2.31445°W		Early 19th century	Originally a cotton mill, and later a shop, the building is in sandstone and has a roof mainly in slate and some stone-slate. It is in three storeys and eight bays, two of which project on the left, and a later extension to the right.	II
Boundary stone 53.79518°N 2.29680°W		Early 19th century (probable)	A township boundary stone, it is in sandstone and it has a flat face and a rounded top. The front face is inscribed "Padiham", and the rear face is hidden.	II
Boundary stone 53.79629°N 2.29841°W		Early 19th century (probable)	A township boundary stone, it is in sandstone and it has a flat face and a rounded top. The front face is inscribed "Padiham", and the rear face "Habergm eaves".	II
Workhouse Farm; 53.79630°N 2.33535°W		Early 19th century (probable)	This was built as a farmhouse and barn, with a workhouse attached to the barn, but is now in a ruinous state. It is in sandstone and has an L-shaped plan.	II
Trevelyan Guest House; 53.80191°N 2.31801°W		c. 1825	A sandstone house with a slate roof and corbelled eaves. It has two storeys and a symmetrical front with a central doorway over which is a round-headed fanlight. In each storey are paired sash windows.	II
Isles House; 53.80142°N 2.32266°W	—	c. 1830	The house incorporates earlier material, and is in millstone grit, partly rendered, with a Welsh slate roof. It has 2 1/2 storeys, and a symmetrical three-bay front. There is a central round-headed doorway with a keystone. Some of the windows are mullioned.	II
22–26 Bank Street; 53.80263°N 2.31599°W		1842	Three houses, partly rendered, with ashlar dressings and slate roofs. Nos. 24 and 26 are on opposite sides of Gawthorpe Street, they have two storeys and attics, and symmetrical gabled fronts. In the centre of each is a doorway with a moulded cornice on consoles, there are two windows on each floor, and a pair of round-headed windows in the attic. No. 22 to the right is in one bay and no attic.	II
1–21 Gawthorpe Street; 53.80234°N 2.31603°W		1842	A row of houses in rendered stone with ashlar dressings, in two storeys. Each house has a single-bay front. Around the openings are long-and-short quoins, and some of the windows have retained their original lozenge glazing.	II
2–6 Gawthorpe Street; 53.80258°N 2.31593°W	—	c. 1842	A row of three houses in rendered stone, in two storeys. Each house has a single-bay front. The original doors and windows have not survived.	II
2 Bank Street, 4 and 6 North Street; 53.80200°N 2.31748°W		1845	This originated as the Oddfellows' Hall, and has since been divided into flats and shops. It is in sandstone with slate roofs, in three storeys, on a corner site with the entrance on the corner. To the left of this are two bays, and to the right are five bays. The entrance has a doorway with a cornice and a pediment. On North Street are two inserted shop fronts and an inscribed plaque.	II
1 and 3 Moor Lane; 53.80209°N 2.31580°W		Late 1840s	Two stone houses in two storeys. They have almost symmetrical fronts, with a projecting gables central bay, and single-bay side wings. No. 1 contains two shop fronts.	II
Stockbridge Lodge; 53.79826°N 2.30603°W		c. 1849–51	The lodge at the southwestern entrance to Gawthorpe Hall was designed by Charles Barry in Jacobean style. It is in sandstone with a slate roof, and has a rectangular plan with two storeys and a three-bay front. At the right end is a canted bay window, in the centre is a porch, and at the rear is a square bay window. On the top of the lodge is a cornice, a parapet of lozenge-shaped balusters and obelisk finials. The windows are mullioned.	II
Gate piers, Stockbridge Lodge; 53.79831°N 2.30609°W		c. 1849–51	A pair of gate piers at the southwestern entrance to Gawthorpe Hall. They are in sandstone, each stands on a base and has an elaborate cornice and a low pyramidal cap.	II
29 Mill Street; 53.80149°N 2.31459°W		1854	Originally a schoolmaster's house, it is in sandstone with a stone-slate roof. The house has two storeys and two bays. There are entrances on the gable end facing the street and on the right side, and on top of the gable are obelisk finials. The windows are mullioned.	II
St Leonard's Church; 53.80199°N 2.31618°W		1866–69	The church was designed by William Waddington Senior in Perpendicular style. It is in sandstone with slate roofs, and has a cruciform plan. The church consists of a nave with a clerestory, aisles, a south porch, transepts, a chancel with a northeast vestry, and a southwest tower. The tower has four stages, clock faces on all sides, and a battlemented parapet with corner turrets surmounted by spirelets and with pinnacles between.	II
Nazareth Unitarian Church; 53.80057°N 2.32035°W		1872–74	The church was designed by Virgil Anderton, a member of the congregation. It built is in sandstone with slate roofs on a sloping site, and has a cruciform plan with school rooms in the basement. The church consists of a nave, transepts, a chancel with aisles, and a northwest steeple. The steeple has a four-stage tower surmounted by an octagonal spire with blind lucarnes. At the top of the tower are octagonal corner turrets between which are gables above the bell openings. The windows contain Geometrical tracery.	II
Wall, gate and gate piers, Nazareth Unitarian Church; 53.80068°N 2.32052°W	—	1872–74	The wall and gate piers are in sandstone, the piers being higher than the wall and with gabled coping. The gates are in cast iron and are in ornate Gothic style. On each pier is a cast iron lamp holder, now damaged.	II
Barclays Bank; 53.80200°N 2.31465°W		1893	The bank was designed by William Dent in Italianate style. It is on a triangular site, and is built in sandstone and polished granite with a green slate roof. The bank has two storeys and five bays, and a circular turret on the corner with clustered columns and a conical roof. The ground floor is rusticated, and the doorway on the corner has pilasters, an entablature, and a pediment with a tympanum containing Renaissance motifs. At the top of the building is a balustrade.	II
National Westminster Bank; 53.80147°N 2.31388°W		1901	The Bank was designed by Mills and Murgatroyd for the Manchester and County Bank in free Elizabethan style. It is in sandstone with a slate roof, and has two storeys and a five-bay front, with a balustraded single-bay on the right. The entrance is in the central bay, and above it is a tower surmounted by a lead-covered cupola with a dome and a finial. To the left of the entrance are modern shop fronts.	II
Town Hall; 53.80029°N 2.31358°W		1938	The town hall was designed by Bradshaw Gass & Hope in Classical style. It is in brick with stone dressings and has a green slate roof. It is built around a square, with a theatre at the back, it has two storeys, and an eleven-bay front. The middle three bays are occupied by a portico with four Corinthian columns and a pediment containing the town's coat of arms. On the top of the building is an open square cupola containing clock faces and with a thin finial. The three central first floor windows have balconies.	II
