= Le Gendre Starkie (1799–1865) =

English landowner and politician

Le Gendre Nicholas Starkie (1 December 1799 – 15 May 1865 (Padiham)) was an English landowner and politician who sat in the House of Commons from 1826 to 1830.

Starkie was the son of Le Gendre Piers Starkie (1760–1807) and his wife Charlotte Preedy, daughter of Rev. Benjamin Preedy, Rector of Brington, Northamptonshire. He was educated at Brasenose College, Oxford.

He inherited a large amount of land in central Lancashire, including Huntroyde Hall, after the early death of his elder brother. He was a J.P. for Lancaster and Yorkshire and Deputy Lieutenant for the Palatine of Lancaster. He was a Captain in the Craven Legion.

In 1826 Starkie was elected Member of Parliament for Pontefract. He held the seat until 1830. He was Provincial Grand Master and Grand Superintendent of the Freemasons of West Lancashire from 1827 till his death. He bought Ashton Hall from the Dukes of Hamilton in 1853.

Starkie died at Huntroyde Hall, Padiham, Lancashire, at the age of 65. He had married Anne Chamberlain, daughter of Abraham Chamberlain of Rylstone, Yorkshire at Burnley in February 1827. Their son Le Gendre inherited the Huntroyde estate and was later MP for Clitheroe, and John inherited the Ashton estate and was MP for Lancashire North East.

Parliament of the United Kingdom
Preceded by Viscount Pollington; Thomas Houldsworth	Member of Parliament for Pontefract; 1826 – 1830; With: Thomas Houldsworth	Succeeded by Henry Stafford-Jerningham; Sir Culling Eardley Smith, Bt
