= Shuttleworth College =

Shuttleworth College may refer to:

- Shuttleworth College (Bedfordshire), a further education college in Old Warden, Bedfordshire
- Shuttleworth College, Padiham, a comprehensive school in Burnley, Lancashire
