= Wilson Greenwood =

English footballer

Personal information
- Date of birth: July 1871
- Place of birth: Padiham, Lancashire, England
- Date of death: January 1943 (age 71)
- Place of death: Padiham, Lancashire, England
- Height: 5 ft 6 in (1.68 m)
- Position: Outside forward

Senior career*
Years	Team	Apps	(Gls)
- Blue Star
- Brierfield
- Accrington
1895	Sheffield United		
1895–1896	Rossendale		
1896–1897	Rochdale Athletic		
1897–1898	Warmley		
1898–1900	Grimsby Town		
1900–1901	Newton Heath	3	(0)
- * Club domestic league appearances and goals

Wilson Greenwood (July 1871 – January 1943) was an English footballer who played as an outside forward. He was born in Padiham, Lancashire. He played in The Football League for Sheffield United, Grimsby Town and Newton Heath.
