= Padiham Town Hall =

Municipal building in Padiham, Lancashire, England

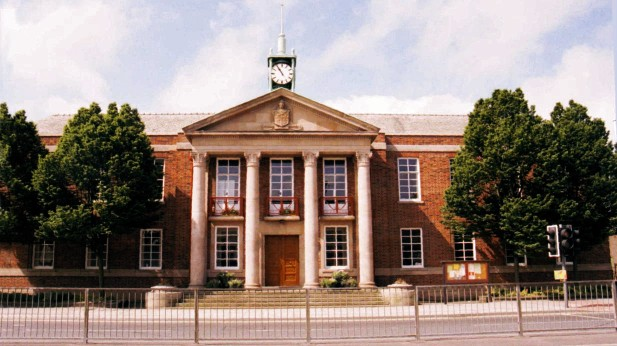
- Padiham Town Hall

- Shown in Lancashire Location in Borough of Burnley
- 53.8003°N 2.3137°W
- Location: Burnley Road, Padiham

History
- Built: 1938

Site notes
- Architect: Bradshaw Gass & Hope
- Architectural style: Neoclassical style

Listed Building – Grade II
- Official name: Town Hall
- Designated: 12 February 1985
- Reference no.: 1237652

Padiham Town Hall is a municipal building in Burnley Road, Padiham, Lancashire, England. The town hall, which was the headquarters of Padiham Urban District Council, is a grade II listed building. It is the meeting place of Padiham Town Council.

== History ==
Shortly after it had been created in 1873, the local board of health established itself in a small office in Mill Street. The area became an urban district in 1894 and population growth associated with the increasing number of coal mines and cotton mills in the area continued into the 1920s. In the early 1930s the former Lord Lieutenant of Lancashire, Lord Shuttleworth of Gawthorpe Hall, urged civic leaders to procure a dedicated town hall: the site they selected had been occupied by the Bridge End Cotton Mill, an ugly building known locally as the "Wonder Mill".

Construction started in March 1936. The new building, which was designed by Bradshaw Gass & Hope in the neoclassical style and built in Accrington red brick with stone facings, was officially opened by the leader of London County Council, Herbert Morrison, on 26 February 1938. The design involved a symmetrical main frontage with eleven bays facing onto Burnley Road; the central section of three bays, which slightly projected forward, featured a full-height tetrastyle portico with Corinthian order columns and a pediment bearing the town's coat of arms. At roof level, there was a turret with a clock. Internally, the principal rooms were the council chamber on the first floor, which was panelled with Australian walnut, and the theatre, which was a single-storey structure at the rear of the building with an Art Deco proscenium arch.

The building continued to serve as the headquarters of the local urban district council for much of the 20th century but ceased to be the local seat of government when the enlarged Burnley Borough Council was formed in 1974. Instead, it became the home of Padiham Town Council when it was formed in 2002.

The building was badly damaged by flooding in the Boxing Day Flood in December 2015 and a programme of repair works to the theatre (by then known as the ballroom) was completed in January 2018. A further programme of refurbishment works, for the rest of the building, costing £331,000 commenced in December 2020.

== See also ==
- Listed buildings in Padiham
