= William Thompson (cricketer, born 1866) =

English cricketer

Personal information
- Full name: William Henry Thompson
- Born: 18 January 1866; Padiham, Lancashire, England
- Died: 28 September 1920 (aged 54); Southport, Lancashire, England
- Batting: Unknown
- Bowling: Unknown

Career statistics
Competition	First-class
Matches	1
Runs scored	10
Batting average	10.00
100s/50s	–/–
Top score	10
Balls bowled	45
Wickets	1
Bowling average	24.00
5 wickets in innings	–
10 wickets in match	–
Best bowling	1/24
Catches/stumpings	–/–
- Source: Cricinfo, 28 July 2013

William Henry Thompson (18 January 1866 – 28 September 1920) was an English cricketer. Thompson's batting and bowling styles are unknown. He was born at Padiham, Lancashire.

Educated at Uppingham School, Thompson made a single first-class appearance for Liverpool and District against Yorkshire in 1892 at Aigburth Cricket Ground, Liverpool. In a match which Liverpool and District won by 6 wickets, Thompson batted once, scoring 10 runs in Liverpool and District's first-innings before he was dismissed by Louis Hall, while with the ball he took a single wicket, that of Thomas Wardall in Yorkshire's second-innings.

He died at Southport, Lancashire on 28 September 1920.
