= Shuttleworth College, Padiham =

Foundation secondary school in Padiham, Lancashire

Shuttleworth College
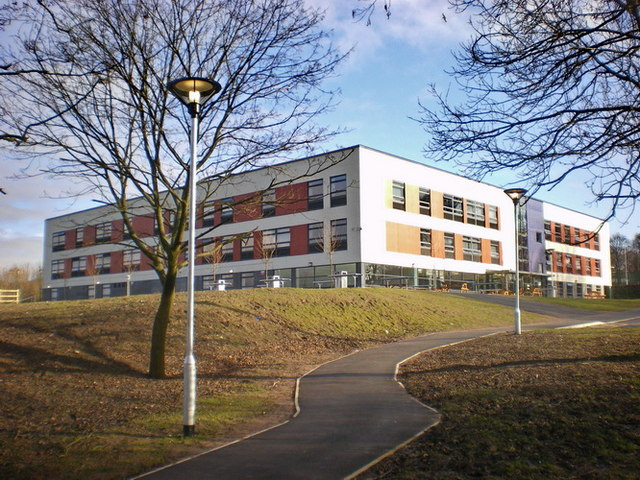

Location
- Burnley Road; Padiham, Lancashire BB12 8ST; England; 53.7973°N 2.2996°W

Information
- Type: Foundation secondary school
- Motto: Learning for the Community
- Established: 2006; 20 years ago
- Founder: Building Schools for the Future
- Local authority: Lancashire
- Department for Education URN: 134994 Tables
- Ofsted: Reports
- Chair of Governors: Kevin Hall
- Head teacher: Ruth England
- Staff: Approx 48 including support staff, caretakers
- Gender: Mixed
- Age: 11 to 16
- Enrolment: 1,082 (2025)
- Colours: Black and red
- Website: www.shuttleworthcollege.org

Shuttleworth College, formerly Gawthorpe High School, is a mixed 11–16 foundation secondary school in Padiham, Lancashire, United Kingdom.

== History ==
The school opened in September 2006 as part of an ambitious plan to replace all of the district's 11-18 education facilities, funded by a government PFI programme called Building Schools for the Future. It was formed from the pupils of Gawthorpe High School and initially operated from the former Habergham High Sixth Form in Kiddrow Lane.

=== Former school ===
Gawthorpe High School was a mixed 11-16 comprehensive school, originally opened in 1967 on land bequeathed from the Shuttleworth Estate.

=== Early history ===
Following an OFSTED inspection in February 2008, the school went into special measures prompting the resignation of the then head teacher, Andrew Mackenzie. Shortly afterwards Martin Burgess was appointed as the new head.

=== New building ===
Shuttleworth moved into new buildings on the former Gawthorpe site at the start of the 2008–09 academic year. Due to the nature of the BSF programme, the £20m, Capita Architecture designed structure and all its equipment is owned and maintained by Bovis Lend Lease.

The building has a square exterior and features a full-height round atrium (which doubles as an auditorium), and eco-friendly features such as a Biomass heating system. The classrooms are grouped into colour-coded departments (e.g. Humanities = Orange), arranged over three floors. The all new facilities included: cutting edge IT and gym equipment, restaurant style kitchen, a dance studio, sports hall, fitness room, tennis courts, and all weather sports pitches.

An Ofsted inspection report in June 2010 resulting in a “satisfactory but improving” grade, marked the end of the special measures status. Following the retirement of Martin Burgess, Bob Wakefield was appointed head teacher in summer 2011. In June 2014 Bob Wakefield stepped down, and Ruth England was appointed as the school's new head.

== Attainment ==
Pupils with equivalent of 5 or more GCSEs grade C or above (inc. English & Maths)
Year (Source)	Students	% special educational needs	England %	School %
2004* (BBC)	146	16.4	42.7	16.0
2005* (BBC)	148	23.6	44.9	32.0
2006	-	-	-	-
2007 (DfE)	160	31.3	46.7	26.0
2008 (DfE)	142	33.9	47.6	26.0
2009 (DfE)	137	43.1	49.8	23.0
2010 (DfE)	132	40.9	53.4	23.0
2011 (DfE)	185	14.0	58.9	40.0
2012 (DfE)	172	14.0	59.4	47.0
2013 (DfE)	209	9.0	59.2	33.0
2014 (DfE)	192	10.0	53.4	34.0
2015 (DfE)	182	2.0	53.8	37.0
*Figures for previous school, in this case: Gawthorpe High School

In 2007, the school's value-added measure was 965.8 (national average 1000), which placed it in the bottom 5% nationally for adding value between the end of Key Stage 2 and the end of Key Stage 4.

=== GCSE Level Performance 2010 ===
137 were eligible, 43.1% of whom had special educational needs.

Absence: 10.5% total (7.2% locally, 7.3% nationally) 13.1% persistent (5.9% locally, 5.9% nationally). Source BBC.

== Notable former pupils ==
Gawthorpe High School

- Simon Danczuk, Labour MP from 2010 to 2017 for Rochdale
- Andy Payton, former footballer

Shuttleworth College

- Ryan Fulton, footballer

== See also ==
- List of schools in Burnley
