= Bill Blackadder =

English footballer

Personal information
- Full name: William Blackadder
- Date of birth: 9 January 1899
- Place of birth: Padiham, England
- Date of death: 11 January 1977
- Place of death: St Annes-on-Sea, England
- Height: 5 ft 8 1/2 in (1.74 m)
- Position: Left half

Senior career*
Years	Team	Apps	(Gls)
1922–1924	Burnley	0	(0)
1924–1925	Accrington Stanley	17	(0)
	Chorley	?	(?)
	Clitheroe	?	(?)
	Lancaster Town	?	(?)
- * Club domestic league appearances and goals

William Blackadder (9 January 1899 – 1977) was an English professional footballer who played as a left half. He started his career with Burnley, but never made a senior appearance for the club. In 1924, he joined Football League Third Division North side Accrington Stanley and played 17 league matches during the 1924–25 season. Blackadder left Accrington in 1925 and moved into non-League football with Chorley, Clitheroe and Lancaster Town.
