= 1869 Radnor Boroughs by-election =

UK parliamentary by-election

The 1869 Radnor Boroughs by-election was fought on 25 February 1869. The by-election was fought due to the resignation of the incumbent MP of the Liberal Party, Richard Green-Price. It was won by the Liberal candidate, Spencer Cavendish who was the Marquess of Hartington.

1869 Radnor by-election
Party	Candidate	Votes	%	±%
Liberal	Spencer Cavendish	546	75.7	N/A
Conservative	George Henry Phillips	175	24.3	N/A
Majority		371	51.4	N/A
Turnout		721	85.7	N/A
Registered electors		841		
Liberal hold				
