= James Maden Holt =

James Maden Holt (18 October 1829 – 19 September 1911) was an English Conservative politician who sat in the House of Commons from 1868 to 1880.

Holt was the son of John Holt of Stubbylee Hall and his wife Judith Maden, daughter of James Maden of Green's House. He was educated at Wellesley House School, St. John's Wood, and at Christ Church, Oxford graduating with M.A. in 1855. He was a J.P. for Lancashire.

At the 1868 general election Holt was elected member of parliament for North East Lancashire. He was re-elected in 1874 and held the seat until he stood down at the 1880 general election.

Holt died at the age of 81.

Parliament of the United Kingdom
New constituency	Member of Parliament for North East Lancashire; 1868 – 1880; With: John Starkie	Succeeded by Frederick William Grafton; Marquess of Hartington
