= John Starkie =

English politician

John Pierce Chamberlain Starkie (28 June 1830 – 12 June 1888) was an English Conservative Party politician who sat in the House of Commons from 1868 to 1880.

Starkie was the son of Le Gendre Nicholas Starkie of Huntroyde Hall, Padiham, Lancashire former M.P. for Pontefract and his wife Anne Chamberlain, daughter of Abraham Chamberlain of Rylstone, Yorkshire. He was educated at Eton College, and at Trinity Hall, Cambridge graduating LLB in 1857 and ML. in 1869. He inherited Ashton Hall on the death of his father.

He was a J.P. for Lancashire, and a lieutenant in the Duke of Lancaster's Own Yeomanry Cavalry.

At the 1868 general election Starkie was elected as a member of parliament for North East Lancashire. He held the seat until his defeat at the 1880 general election.

Starkie died at the age of 57. He had married in 1861 Ann Charlotte Amelia Hudson, daughter of Harrington Hudson of Blessingby, Yorkshire, with whom he had two daughters.

Parliament of the United Kingdom
New constituency	Member of Parliament for North East Lancashire; 1868 – 1880; With: James Maden Holt	Succeeded by Frederick William Grafton; Marquess of Hartington
