= List of schools in Burnley =

The following is a list of active schools in the Borough of Burnley in Lancashire, England.

By default, the table below is sorted into state schools (i.e. primary, secondary, special, etc.), independent schools, and further and higher education establishments.

School	Locality	Description	Ofsted	Website
Barden Primary School	Burnley	Primary school	119260	website
Briercliffe Primary School	Briercliffe	Primary school	119168	website
Burnley Brunshaw Primary School	Burnley	Primary school	119217	website
Burnley Casterton Primary School	Burnley	Primary school	119219	website
Burnley Heasandford Primary School	Burnley	Primary school	119216	website
Burnley Holy Trinity C of E Primary School	Burnley	Primary school	119485	website
Burnley Ightenhill Primary School	Burnley	Primary school	119264	website
Burnley Lowerhouse Junior School	Burnley	Primary school	119215	
Burnley Springfield Community Primary School	Burnley	Primary school	133546	website
Burnley St James' Lanehead C of E Primary School	Burnley	Primary school	119487	website
Burnley Stoneyholme Community Primary School	Burnley	Primary school	119257	website
Burnley St Peter's C of E Primary School	Burnley	Primary school	119484	website
Burnley St Stephen's C of E Voluntary Aided Primary School	Burnley	Primary school	119486	website
Burnley Whittlefield Primary School	Burnley	Primary school	119262	website
Cherry Fold Community Primary School	Burnley	Primary school	133622	website
Christ The King RC Primary School	Burnley	Primary school	119488	
Hapton C of E / Methodist Primary School	Hapton	Primary school	119407	website
Padiham Green C of E Primary School	Padiham	Primary school	119366	
Padiham Primary School	Padiham	Primary school	119164	website
Padiham St Leonard's Voluntary Aided C of E Primary School	Padiham	Primary school	119405	website
Rosegrove Infant School	Burnley	Primary school	119258	website
Rosewood Primary School	Burnley	Primary school	133437	website
St Augustine of Canterbury RC Primary School	Burnley	Primary school	119491	website
St John's C of E Primary School	Cliviger	Primary school	119432	website
St John the Baptist RC Primary School	Padiham	Primary school	119648	website
St John the Baptist RC Primary School	Burnley	Primary school	119683	
St Mary Magdalene's RC Primary School	Burnley	Primary school	119489	website
St Mary's RC Primary School	Burnley	Primary school	119703	
Wellfield Methodist and Anglican Church School	Burnley	Primary school	119492	website
Worsthorne Primary School	Worsthorne	Primary school	119181	website
Blessed Trinity RC Community College	Burnley	Secondary school	134997	website
Burnley High School	Burnley/Padiham	Secondary School	141028	website
Sir John Thursby Community College	Burnley	Secondary school	134996	website
Shuttleworth College	Padiham	Secondary school	134994	website
Unity College	Burnley	Secondary school	135003	website
Visions Learning Trust	Burnley	University Technical College		website
Holly Grove School	Burnley	Special school	135014	
The Rose School	Burnley	Special school	134625	
Ridgewood Community High School	Burnley	Special school	135013	website
Isaac Centre Short Stay School	Burnley	Pupil Referral Unit	135326	
Burnley and Pendle PCSS Hargher Clough	Burnley	Pupil Referral Unit	128089	
St Joseph's Park Hill School (RC Preparatory)	Burnley	Independent School		website
Thomas Whitham Sixth Form	Burnley	Sixth form college	135000	website
Burnley College	Burnley	Further education	130735	website

== See also ==
- List of schools in Lancashire
- Education in England
- Office for Standards in Education
- List of the oldest schools in the United Kingdom
