= Listed buildings in Simonstone, Lancashire =

Simonstone is a civil parish in Ribble Valley, Lancashire, England. It contains 22 listed buildings that are recorded in the National Heritage List for England. All of the listed buildings are designated at Grade II, the lowest of the three grades, which is applied to "buildings of national importance and special interest". The parish contains the village of Simonstone and surrounding countryside. The listed buildings are almost all houses and associated structures, or farmhouses and farm buildings, the others being a milestone and a former toll house.

== Buildings ==
Name and location	Photograph	Date	Notes
Cockshutts Farmhouse and Cottage; 53.80665°N 2.34117°W	—	16th century	Originally a farmhouse, it has been converted into two dwellings, and is in sandstone with a stone-slate roof. It is in two storeys, and the building has a T-shaped plan, with a two-bay hall, a projecting two-storey stair-turret porch, and a cross wing at the left. The doorway has a chamfered surround, most of the windows are mullioned, and some contain sash windows. Inside the house is a small inglenook.
West Cottages; 53.81139°N 2.33239°W	—	Late 16th century (possible)	Originally a farmhouse, later converted into two dwellings, it is in sandstone with quoins and a tile roof. There are two storeys and three bays, with a lean-to at each end. The building contains three Tudor-style doorways and mullioned windows.
Huntroyde; 53.81208°N 2.32635°W	—	1576	A country house that was much altered during the 19th century, and has since been divided into two dwellings. It is mainly in sandstone with a roof of slate and lead. The house is in Jacobean style, is mostly in two storeys with an embattled parapet, and consists of a four-bay hall with a cross wing to the left and a three-stage tower to the right. Most of the windows on the front are mullioned and transomed. The cross wing has a crow-stepped gable, and contains a two-storey bay window.
Eveson's Farmhouse and Cottage; 53.80325°N 2.34322°W		Late 16th or early 17th century	A farmhouse later converted into two dwellings, it is in sandstone with quoins and has a stone-slate roof. There are two storeys and three bays; at the rear is an outshut and a lean-to extension. The windows are mullioned, and inside there is a large inglenook bressumer.
Simonstone Hall; 53.80435°N 2.34061°W	—	17th century	A country house that was remodelled and refronted in 1818. It is in sandstone with quoins and a stone-slate roof, and in Jacobean style. It has a rectangular plan, with a front of three gabled bays, and sides of two bays. The windows are mullioned, and the doorway has a moulded surround, and a lintel with a carved coat of arms. In the first bay is a two-storey canted bay window, and there are spike finials on the gables.
Barn and stable range, Simonstone Hall; 53.80452°N 2.34032°W	—	17th century	The barn and stable range are in sandstone with quoins and a stone-slate roof. The barn has five bays, and contains a wagon entrance with a segmental arch, two square windows, and a blocked chamfered doorway. Inside are two-bay aisles. The stable range dates from the 19th century, and has two wagon doors, a plain doorway, and three round pitching holes.
Starkie Farmhouse; 53.80442°N 2.34384°W	—	17th century (probable)	The house is in sandstone, partly rendered, with quoins and a tile roof. It is in two storeys, and has two bays. There is a single-storey extension to the right with a stone-slate roof. The windows are mullioned or mullioned and transomed, and there is a modern lean-to porch on the front.
Foulds House Farmhouse; 53.82075°N 2.31796°W	—	1677	A sandstone house with quoins and a stone-slate roof, in two storeys and two bays. In the centre is a two-storey porch, containing a doorway with a chamfered surround and a lintel shaped to make a Tudor arch. Above the doorway is a datestone, and the windows are mullioned.
Barn and stable, Foulds House Farm; 53.82085°N 2.31811°W	—	Late 17th century (probable)	The building is in sandstone with quoins and a stone-slate roof. It has five bays, with two of them aisled. The barn contains a wagon entrance that has a segmental arch with an inscribed keystone, and ventilation slits. The stable in the first bay contains a blocked doorway with large jambs and a lintel, and a modern doorway.
Priddy Bank Farmhouse and Cottage; 53.81899°N 2.32359°W	—	Late 17th century	The cottage was added to the right in the 18th century. The building is in gritstone with quoins and a stone-slate roof. It is in two storeys, originally with two bays, and the cottage has one bay. The windows are mullioned, and inside there is an inglenook bressumer.
Pump House Farmhouse; 53.80876°N 2.33804°W	—	Late 17th century (probable)	A stone farmhouse, later divided in into two dwellings, mainly rendered, with a stone-slate roof. It has two storeys and three bays, with a porch and a rear outshut. The windows are mullioned.
Top o'th' Bank Farmhouse; 53.80346°N 2.34202°W	—	Late 17th or early 18th century	A sandstone farmhouse, partly rendered, with quoins and a stone-slate roof, in two units and two storeys. Most of the windows are mullioned.
Cuckoo Hall; 53.81706°N 2.32063°W	—	Early 18th century (probable)	The farmhouse was remodelled in the 19th century. It is in sandstone with quoins and a stone-slate roof, and is in Jacobean style. The house has two storeys, and a symmetrical front of three bays. In the centre is a gabled porch. All the openings have hood moulds, and the windows are sashes.
Wilkinson's Farmhouse; 53.80414°N 2.34427°W	—	Early 18th century (probable)	A sandstone house, partly rendered, with a tile roof, in two storeys and three bays. The windows are mullioned, and the doorway has large jambs and a rectangular lintel.
Lower Trap Farmhouse and barn 53.81492°N 2.33846°W	—	18th century	The farmhouse and barn are in sandstone with a stone-slate roof. They are in two storeys and three bays, and there is a lean-to extension on the left. On the front are mullioned windows, a large wagon entrance with a segmental arch, and a plain doorway.
Pigsties and poultry loft, Wilkinson's Farm; 53.80423°N 2.34460°W	—	18th century (probable)	The building is in sandstone with quoins and a slate roof. It has two storeys, with five pigsties in the lower storey, and five windows leading into a poultry loft above. At the right gable end are steps leading to a first floor doorway.
Ha-ha; 53.81149°N 2.32678°W	—	Late 18th century (probable)	The ha-ha is in the grounds of Huntroyde. It has a facing wall of sandstone, it is slightly curved, and is about 175 metres (574 ft) long. Near the east end are three steps.
Priddy Bank Cottages; 53.81862°N 2.32358°W	—	Late 18th century	Originally a row of three cottages, later converted into two dwellings. They are in sandstone with quoins and a stone-slate roof, and have two storeys. Each cottage is in one bay, and at the rear is a continuous outshut. The doorways have plain surrounds. Some of the windows are mullioned, one is a casement, and others have altered glazing.
Feeding shed 53.81802°N 2.33066°W		Early 19th century (probable)	The feeding shed for cattle is in sandstone with a stone-slate roof, and is in Gothic style. It has a central single cell, with a bay on each side, forming a cruciform plan. The north and south sides are gabled with arched entrances, that on the south being more elaborate.
Toll Bar Cottage; 53.80550°N 2.34423°W		Early 19th century	The former toll house is in sandstone with a stone-slate roof, in two storeys and two bays. The windows are sashes, and there is a single-storey gabled porch. In the upper floor of the gable end is a Gothic-style arched window.
Milestone; 53.80623°N 2.34729°W	—	Mid 19th century	The milestone is in stone and has a rounded top. It is inscribed with the name of the parish, and with the distances in miles to Clitheroe and to Whalley.
Wall Green; 53.81327°N 2.31995°W	—	Mid 19th century	The house, later used for other purposes, is in sandstone with a stone-slate roof. It is in Jacobean style, with two storeys, a symmetrical three-bay front, and a one-bay extension at the rear. All the openings have Tudor arched heads. The windows are mullioned, and in the centre of the front is an open porch. The gable on the extension has a ball finial.
