= Harry Hastie =

English footballer

Personal information
- Full name: Henry Hastie
- Place of birth: Padiham, England
- Position: Full back

Senior career*
Years	Team	Apps	(Gls)
1919–1920	Burnley	7	(0)
- Fleetwood Town
- Morecambe
- * Club domestic league appearances and goals

Henry Hastie was an English professional footballer who played as a full back.
