= Tyldesley witch =

Edmund Hartley, dubbed the Tyldesley witch (died March 1597), was a cunning man who from 1595 until 1596 was alleged to have practised witchcraft at Cleworth Hall in Tyldesley, Lancashire. Hartley was hanged, twice, after a trial at Lancaster Assizes in March 1597.

== Background ==
At the end of the 16th century in Elizabethan England superstition and belief in witchcraft were rife, there were religious tensions between the supporters of the new faith, the Church of England, Puritans and adherents of Roman Catholicism. Lancashire was a sparsely populated county at the time of the Reformation and remained a stronghold of Catholicism throughout the Elizabethan reign. The county was reputed to contain more witches and believers in witchcraft than any other. Cunning folk were regarded as being distinct from witches and were called on to perform acts of healing.

== History ==
Anne Parr, who had inherited Cleworth Hall, married Nicholas Starkie of Huntroyde depriving her Roman Catholic relations of what they considered their inheritance. Some were said to have prayed for the death of her four children that died in infancy. Their surviving children, Ann aged about ten, and John, two years older began having fits. Their father spent £200 on doctors with no success and became convinced they were "possessed by the Devil". He asked a Catholic priest to exorcise the evil spirits but the priest declined. Starkie in desperation approached Edmund Hartley, a magician and travelling "conjurer", who was in the neighbourhood for help.

Using charms and herbal potions, Hartley was able to calm the children but not cure them completely. Starkey paid 40 shillings per year for Hartley's services but Hartley demanded more. Starkie's refusal to give Hartley a house and land resulted in threats and in the afternoon three other children in the house, Margaret and Ellinor Hurdman and Ellen Holland, a maid, Jane Ashton and a relative, Margaret Byrom, were also affected.

Starkie suspected that Hartley was by then part of the problem and consulted John Dee, warden of the Collegiate Church in Manchester. Dee was reluctant to become involved, but rebuked Hartley and advised Starkie to consult "some godly preachers". For a short while all was quiet at Cleworth Hall but the children's fits and bouts of shouting returned. The maid, Jane Ashton and Margaret Byrom were affected after being kissed by Hartley who "breathed the Devil" into them. Hartley followed Margaret Byrom to her home in Salford where he was found by preachers, and unable to recite the Lord's Prayer was accused of witchcraft.

The story of the demonic possessions at Cleworth Hall was documented by George More, who with John Darrell and several others including a local curate, arrived at Cleworth after Hartley's execution in March 1597 to dispossess the seven of their demons. In turn Darrell and More were imprisoned for their involvement in the dispossessions.

== Witch trial ==
Hartley was arrested and sent for trial to Lancaster. At his trial in March 1597, Starkie said that the previous autumn while in the woods at Huntroyde, Hartley had drawn a circle " with many crosses and partitions". Starkie's evidence led to the death penalty. Hartley's execution was botched, at the first attempt to hang him the rope broke but even though Hartley repented he was hanged at the second attempt.
