= Spencer Cavendish, 8th Duke of Devonshire =

British statesman (1833–1908)

His Grace The Duke of Devonshire KG GCVO PC PC (Ire) FRS
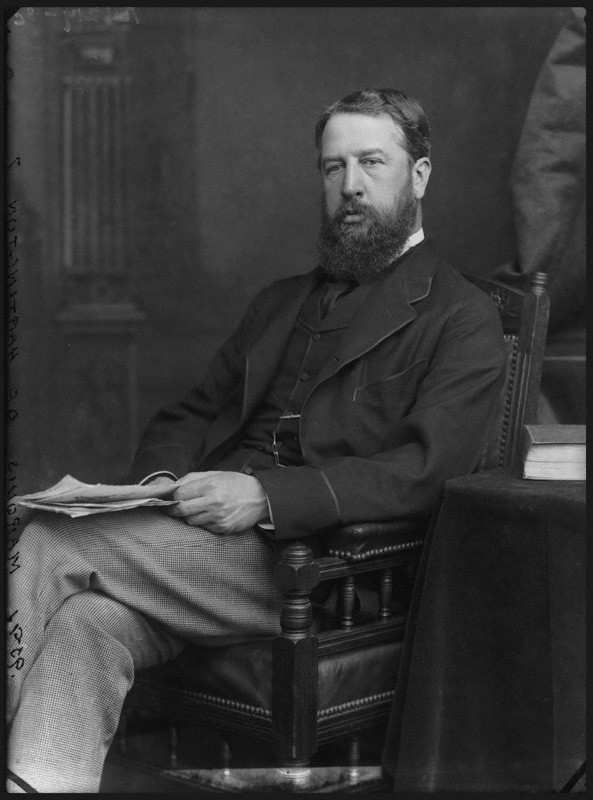
- The 8th Duke of Devonshire c. 1883

Leader of the House of Lords
- In office 12 July 1902 – 13 October 1903
- Monarch: Edward VII
- Prime Minister: Arthur Balfour
- Preceded by: The Marquess of Salisbury
- Succeeded by: The Marquess of Lansdowne

President of the Board of Education
- In office 3 March 1900 – 8 August 1902
- Monarchs: Victoria; Edward VII
- Prime Minister: The Marquess of Salisbury; Arthur Balfour
- Preceded by: Sir John Eldon Gorst
- Succeeded by: The Marquess of Londonderry

Lord President of the Council
- In office 29 June 1895 – 19 October 1903
- Monarchs: Victoria; Edward VII
- Prime Minister: The Marquess of Salisbury; Arthur Balfour
- Preceded by: The Earl of Rosebery
- Succeeded by: The Marquess of Londonderry
Cabinet offices 1868–1885
Secretary of State for War
In office 16 December 1882 – 9 June 1885
Monarch	Victoria
Prime Minister	William Ewart Gladstone
Preceded by	Hugh Childers
Succeeded by	W. H. Smith
In office 16 February 1866 – 26 June 1866
Monarch	Victoria
Prime Minister	The Earl Russell
Preceded by	The Earl de Grey
Succeeded by	Jonathan Peel
Secretary of State for India
In office 28 April 1880 – 16 December 1882
Monarch	Victoria
Prime Minister	William Ewart Gladstone
Preceded by	The Viscount Cranbrook
Succeeded by	The Earl of Kimberley
Chief Secretary for Ireland
In office 12 January 1871 – 17 February 1874
Monarch	Victoria
Prime Minister	William Ewart Gladstone
Preceded by	Chichester Parkinson-Fortescue
Succeeded by	Michael Hicks Beach
Postmaster General
In office 9 December 1868 – 14 January 1871
Monarch	Victoria
Prime Minister	William Ewart Gladstone
Preceded by	The Duke of Montrose
Succeeded by	William Monsell
Junior ministerial offices
Parliamentary Under-Secretary of State for War
In office 2 May 1863 – 17 February 1866
Monarch	Victoria
Prime Minister	The Viscount Palmerston; The Earl Russell
Preceded by	The Earl de Grey
Succeeded by	The Lord Dufferin and Claneboye
Civil Lord of the Admiralty
In office 23 March 1863 – 2 May 1863
Monarch	Victoria
Prime Minister	The Viscount Palmerston
Preceded by	Samuel Whitbread
Succeeded by	James Stansfeld
Party political offices
Leader of the Conservative Party in the House of Lords
In office 1902–1903
Overall Leader	Arthur Balfour
Preceded by	The Marquess of Salisbury
Succeeded by	The Marquess of Landsowne
Leader of the Liberal Unionist Party in the House of Lords
In office 1891–1903
Commons Leader	Joseph Chamberlain
Preceded by	The Earl of Derby
Succeeded by	The Marquess of Landsowne
Leader of the Liberal Unionist Party in the House of Commons
In office 1886–1891
Lords Leader	The Earl of Derby
Preceded by	Position established
Succeeded by	Joseph Chamberlain
Leader of the Liberal Party in the House of Commons
In office 3 February 1875 – 23 April 1880
Lords Leader	The Earl Granville
Preceded by	William Ewart Gladstone
Succeeded by	William Ewart Gladstone

Personal details
- Born: 23 July 1833 Cartmel, Cumbria, England
- Died: 24 March 1908 (aged 74) Chatsworth House, Derbyshire, England
- Party: Liberal Unionist (1886–1908); Liberal (1857–1886) Conservative Party (1902–1903)
- Spouse: Louisa Frederica Augusta von Alten (m. 1892)
- Parents: William Cavendish, 7th Duke of Devonshire; Lady Blanche Howard
- Education: Trinity College, Cambridge

Military service
- Branch/service: British Army
- Unit: Duke of Lancaster's Own Yeomanry; Sherwood Foresters; 1st Sussex Artillery Volunteers

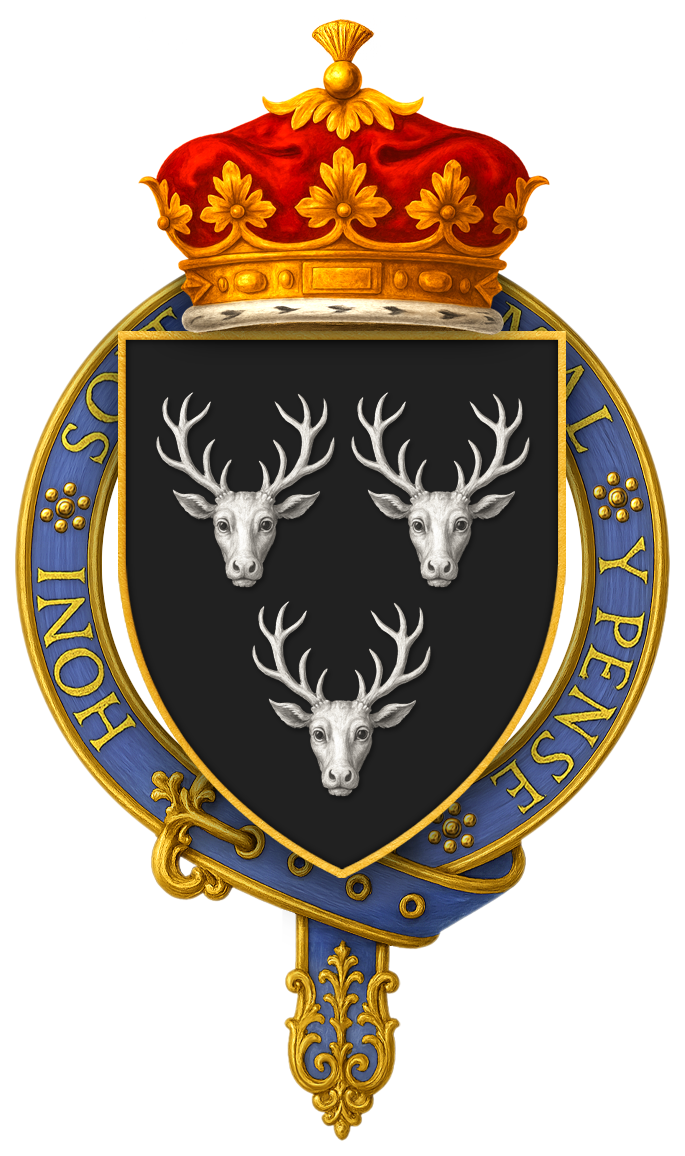
Garter-encircled arms of Spencer Cavendish, 8th Duke of Devonshire, KG, GCVO, PC, FRS

Spencer Compton Cavendish, 8th Duke of Devonshire (23 July 1833 – 24 March 1908), styled Lord Cavendish of Keighley between 1834 and 1858 and Marquess of Hartington between 1858 and 1891, was a British statesman. He has the distinction of having held leading positions in three political parties: at different times he led Liberal Party, the Liberal Unionist Party and the Conservative Party in either the House of Commons or the House of Lords. After 1886 he increasingly voted with the Conservatives. He declined to become prime minister on three occasions, because the circumstances were never right. Historian and politician Roy Jenkins said he was "too easy-going and too little of a party man". He held some passions, but he rarely displayed them regarding the most controversial issues of the day.

== Background and education ==
Devonshire was the eldest son of William Cavendish, 2nd Earl of Burlington, who succeeded his cousin as Duke of Devonshire in 1858, and Lady Blanche Cavendish (née Howard). Lord Frederick Cavendish and Lord Edward Cavendish were his younger brothers. He was educated at Trinity College, Cambridge, where he graduated as MA in 1854, having taken a Second in the Mathematical Tripos. He later was made honorary LLD in 1862, and as DCL at Oxford University in 1878.

In later life he continued his interests in education as Chancellor of his old university from 1892, and of Manchester University from 1907 until his death. He was Lord Rector of Edinburgh University from 1877 to 1880.

== Liberal, 1857–86 ==
After joining the special mission to Russia for Alexander II's accession, Lord Cavendish of Keighley (as he was styled at the time) entered Parliament in the 1857 general election, when he was returned for North Lancashire as a Liberal (his title "Lord Hartington", by which he became known in 1858, was a courtesy title; not being a peer in his own right, he was eligible to sit in the Commons until 1891, when he succeeded his father as Duke of Devonshire). Between 1863 and 1874, Lord Hartington held various Government posts, including Civil Lord of the Admiralty and Under-Secretary of State for War under Palmerston and Earl Russell. In the 1868 general election he lost his seat; having refused the Lord Lieutenancy of Ireland, he was made Postmaster-General, without a seat in the Cabinet. The next year he re-entered the Commons, having been returned for Radnor. In 1870 Hartington reluctantly accepted the post of Chief Secretary for Ireland in Gladstone's first government.

In 1875 – the year following Liberal defeat at a general election — he succeeded William Ewart Gladstone as Leader of the Liberal opposition in the House of Commons, after the other serious contender, W. E. Forster, had indicated that he was not interested in the post. The following year, however, Gladstone returned to active political life in the campaign against Turkey's Bulgarian Atrocities. The relative political fortunes of Gladstone and Hartington fluctuated – Gladstone was not popular at the time of Benjamin Disraeli's triumph at the Congress of Berlin, but the Midlothian Campaigns of 1879–80 marked him out as the Liberals' foremost public campaigner.

In 1880, after Disraeli's government lost the general election, Hartington was invited by the Queen to form a government, but declined – as did the Earl Granville, Liberal Leader in the House of Lords – after Gladstone made it clear that he would not serve under anybody else. Hartington chose instead to serve in Gladstone's second government as Secretary of State for India (1880–1882) and Secretary of State for War (1882–1885).

In 1884 he was instrumental in persuading Gladstone to send General Gordon on a mission to evacuate the Sudan. Despite the repeated objections of consul-general in Egypt Sir Evelyn Baring, the indomitable Gordon was finally sent to Khartoum, where he did exactly the opposite of what he was sent to do, resulting in the siege of the city by the Mahdi and the final massacre of Gordon and 20,000 Arabs. Before the imminent catastrophe, Hartington persuaded Gladstone to send troops for the relief of Khartoum which arrived two days too late. A considerable number of the Conservative party long held him chiefly responsible for the "betrayal of Gordon". His lethargic manner, apart from his position as war minister, helped to associate him in their minds with a disaster which emphasized the fact that the government acted "too late"; but Gladstone and Lord Granville were no less responsible than he.

== Liberal Unionist, 1886–1908 ==
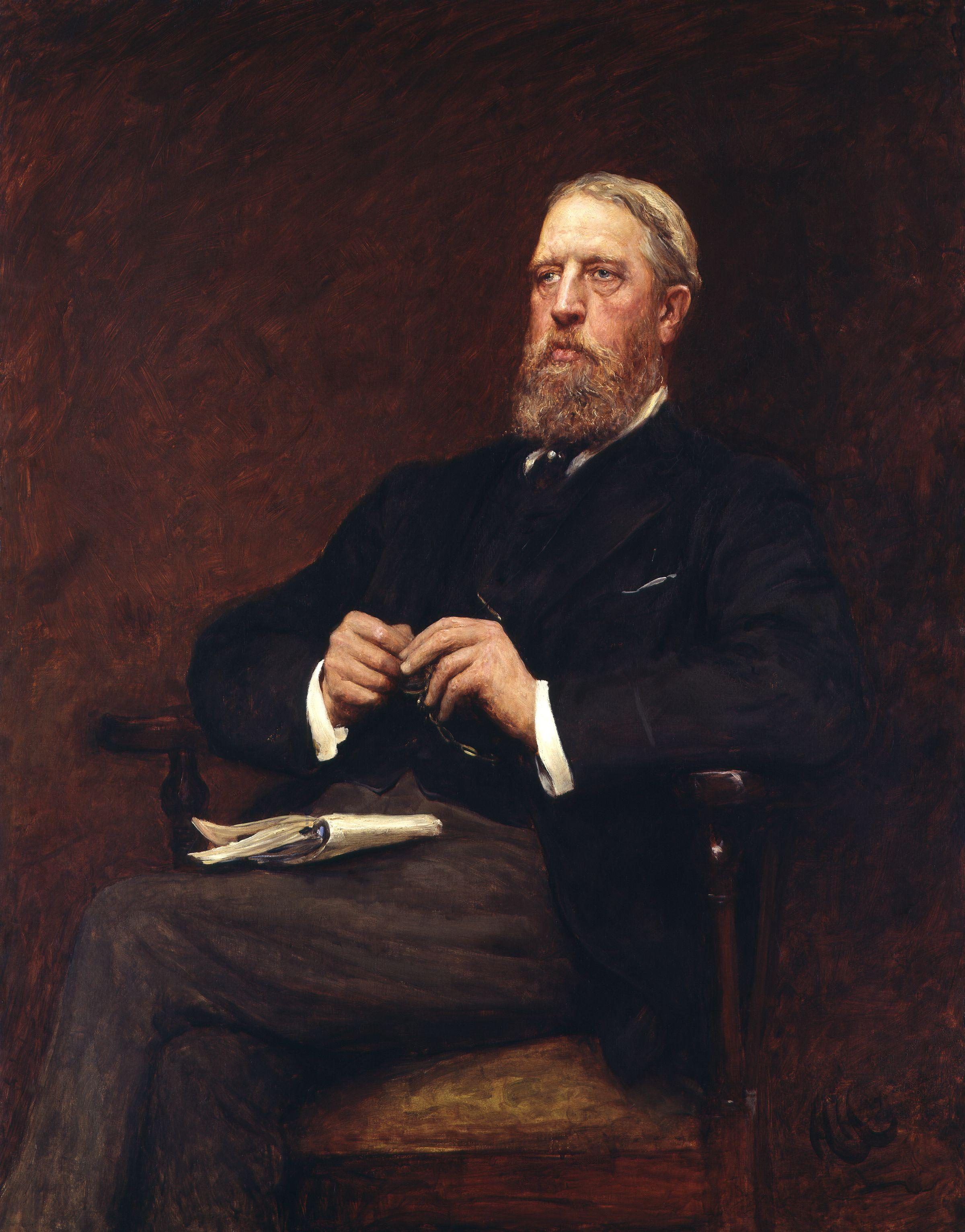
The Duke of Devonshire by Sir Hubert von Herkomer

Hartington became increasingly uneasy with Gladstone's Irish policies, especially after the murder of his younger brother Lord Frederick Cavendish in Phoenix Park. After being elected in December 1885 for the newly created Rossendale Division of Lancashire, he broke with Gladstone altogether. He declined to serve in Gladstone's third government, formed after Gladstone came out in favour of Irish Home Rule (unlike Joseph Chamberlain, who accepted the Local Government Board but then resigned), and after opposing the First Home Rule Bill became the leader of the Liberal Unionists. After the general election of 1886 Hartington declined to become Prime Minister, preferring instead to hold the balance of power in the House of Commons and give support from the back benches to the second Conservative government of Lord Salisbury. Early in 1887, after the resignation of Lord Randolph Churchill, Salisbury offered to step down and serve in a government under Hartington, who now declined the premiership for the third time. Instead, the Liberal Unionist George Goschen accepted the Exchequer in Churchill's place.

Having succeeded as Duke of Devonshire in 1891 he entered the House of Lords where, in 1893, he formally moved for the rejection of the Second Home Rule Bill. Devonshire eventually joined Salisbury's third government in 1895 as Lord President of the Council, and from March 1900 was also President of the Board of Education. Devonshire was not asked to become Prime Minister when Lord Salisbury retired in favour of his nephew Arthur Balfour in 1902. He resigned from the government in 1903, and from the Liberal Unionist Association the following spring, in protest at Joseph Chamberlain's Tariff Reform scheme. Devonshire said of Chamberlain's proposals:

I venture to express the opinion that [Chamberlain] will find among the projects and plans which he will be called upon to discuss none containing a more Socialistic principle than that which is embodied in his own scheme, which, whether it can properly be described as a scheme of protection or not, is certainly a scheme under which the State is to undertake to regulate the course of commerce and of industry, and tell us where we are to buy, where we are to sell, what commodities we are to manufacture at home, and what we may continue, if we think right, to import from other countries.

Balfour, trying to juggle different factions, had allowed both Chamberlain and Free Trade supporters to resign from the government, hoping that Devonshire would remain for the sake of balance, but the latter eventually resigned under pressure from Charles Thomson Ritchie and from his wife, who still hoped that he might lead a government including leading Liberals. But in the autumn of 1907 his health gave way, and grave symptoms of cardiac weakness necessitated his abstaining from public effort and spending the winter abroad. He died, rather suddenly of pneumonia in his home after falling ill on his vacation to Cannes, on 24 March 1908.

== Military service ==
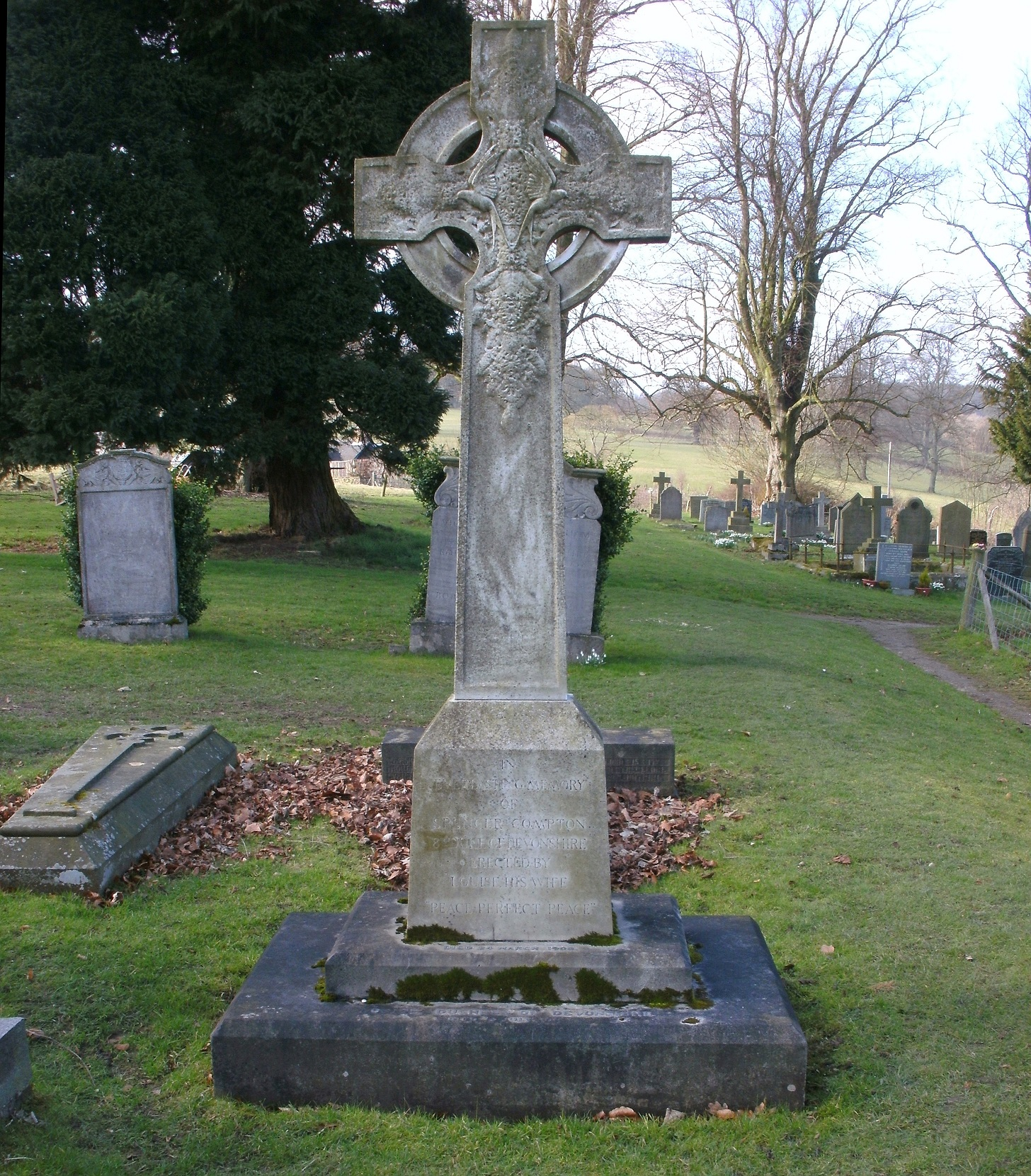
The Duke of Devonshire's grave in St Peter's Churchyard, Edensor

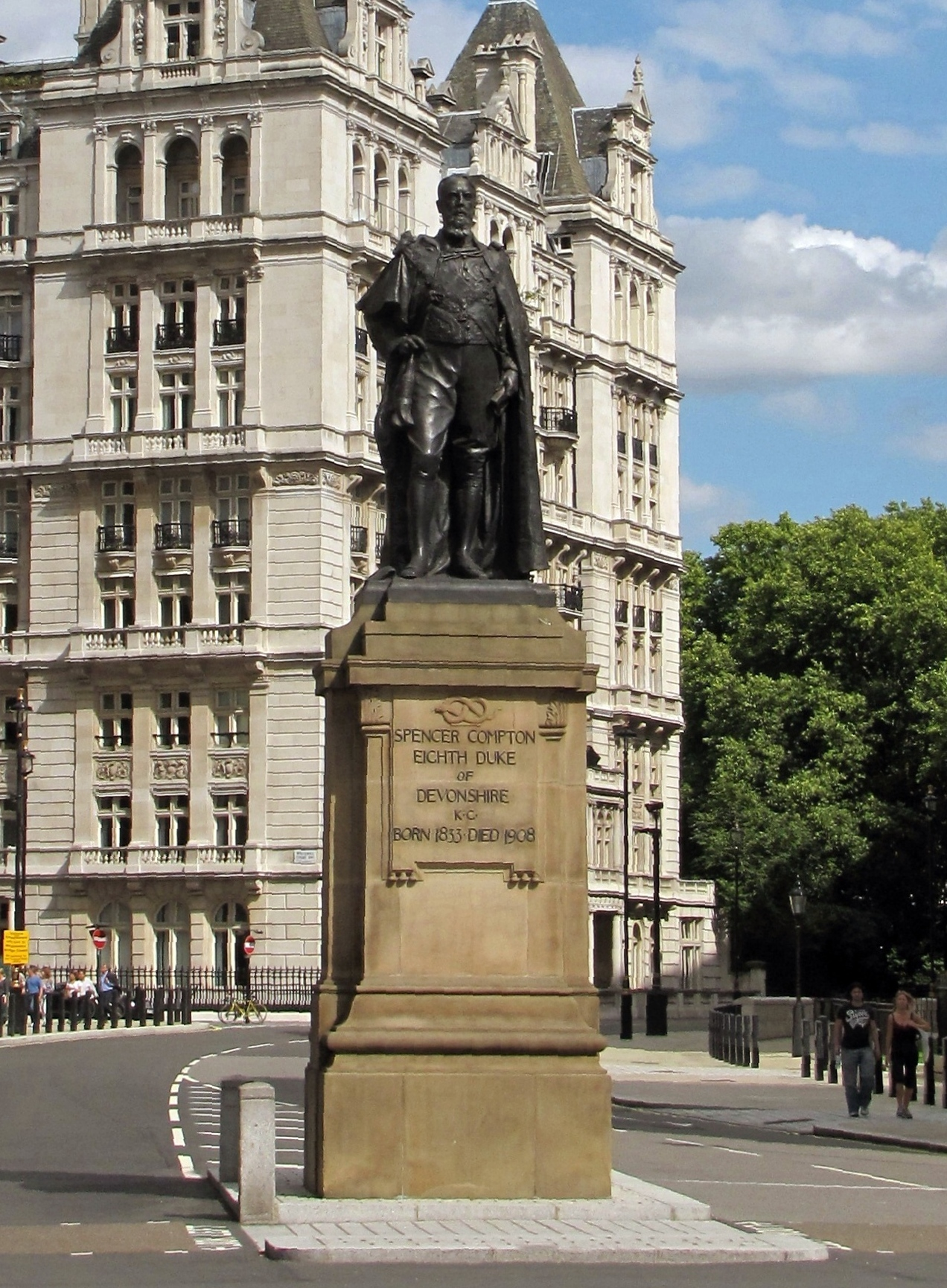
Statue of the Duke of Devonshire by Herbert Hampton in Whitehall, London

He served part-time as a captain in the Duke of Lancaster's Own Yeomanry from 1855 to 1873, and when the 6th Duke of Devonshire raised the 2nd Derbyshire Militia (Chatsworth Rifles) in 1855, he was commissioned as its major. He was appointed honorary colonel of the regiment (later the 3rd (2nd Derbyshire Militia) Battalion, Sherwood Foresters, from 1871. He was also honorary colonel of the 2nd Sussex Artillery Volunteers from 1887, and of the 1st Volunteer Battalion the Sherwood Foresters (Nottinghamshire and Derbyshire Regiment) from 4 March 1903.

== Personal life ==
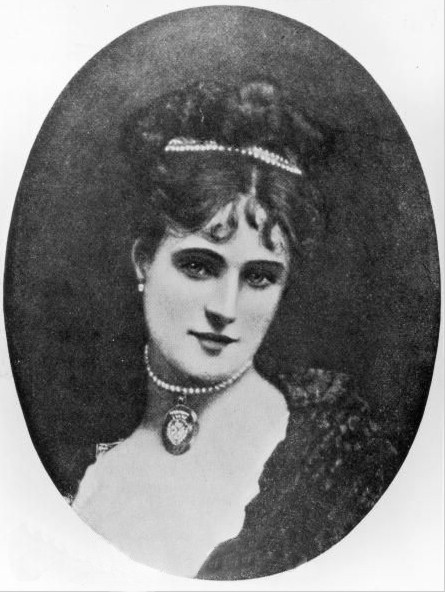
Catherine Walters

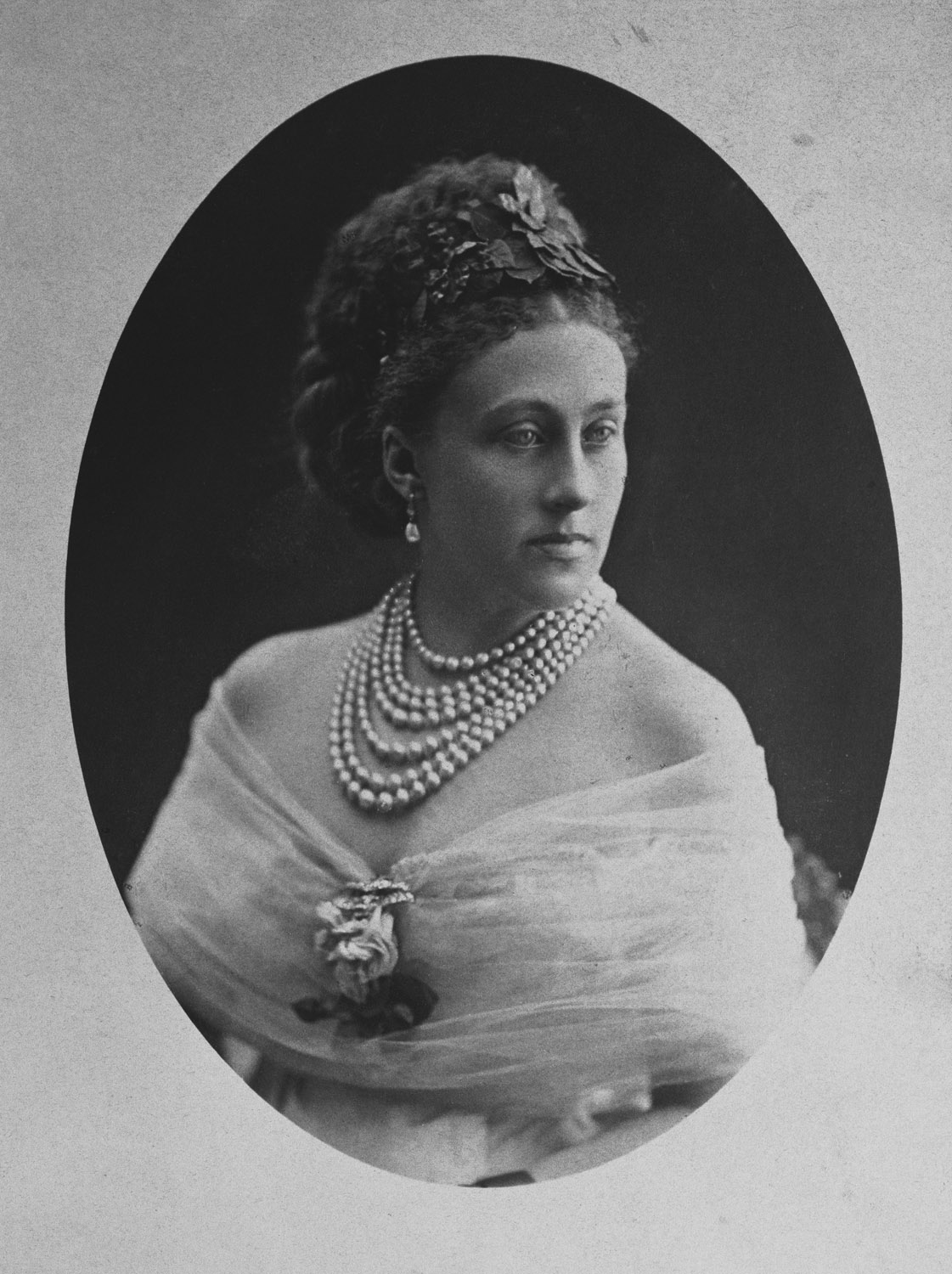
Louise Montagu, Duchess of Manchester 1884

Hartington took great pains to parade his interest in horseracing, so as to cultivate an image of not being entirely obsessed by politics. For many years, the courtesan Catherine Walters ("Skittles") was his mistress. He was married at Christ Church, Mayfair, on 16 August 1892, at the age of 59, to Louisa Frederica Augusta von Alten, widow of the late William Drogo Montagu, 7th Duke of Manchester.

Upon his death, he was succeeded by his nephew Victor Cavendish. He died of pneumonia at the Chatsworth House in Derbyshire, and was interred on 28 March 1908 at St Peter's Churchyard, Edensor, Derbyshire. A statue of the Duke can be found at the junction of Whitehall and Horse Guards Avenue in London, and also on the Western Lawns at Eastbourne.

== Legacy ==
Upon receiving news of the Duke's death, the House of Lords took the unprecedented step of adjourning in his honour. Margot Asquith said the Duke of Devonshire "was a man whose like we shall never see again; he stood by himself and could have come from no country in the world but England. He had the figure and appearance of an artisan, with the brevity of a peasant, the courtesy of a king and the noisy sense of humour of a Falstaff. He gave a great, wheezy guffaw at all the right things and was possessed of endless wisdom. He was perfectly disengaged from himself, fearlessly truthful and without pettiness of any kind".

Historian Jonathan Parry claimed that "He inherited the whig belief in the duty of political leadership, afforced by the intellectual notions characteristic of well-educated, propertied early to mid-Victorian Liberals: a confidence that the application of free trade, rational public administration, scientific enquiry, and a patriotic defence policy would promote Britain's international greatness—in which he strongly believed—and her economic and social progress...he became a model of the dutiful aristocrat". It has been said that he was "the best excuse that the last half-century has produced for the continuance of the peerages".

With 24 years of government service, Devonshire's is the fourth-longest ministerial career in modern British politics.

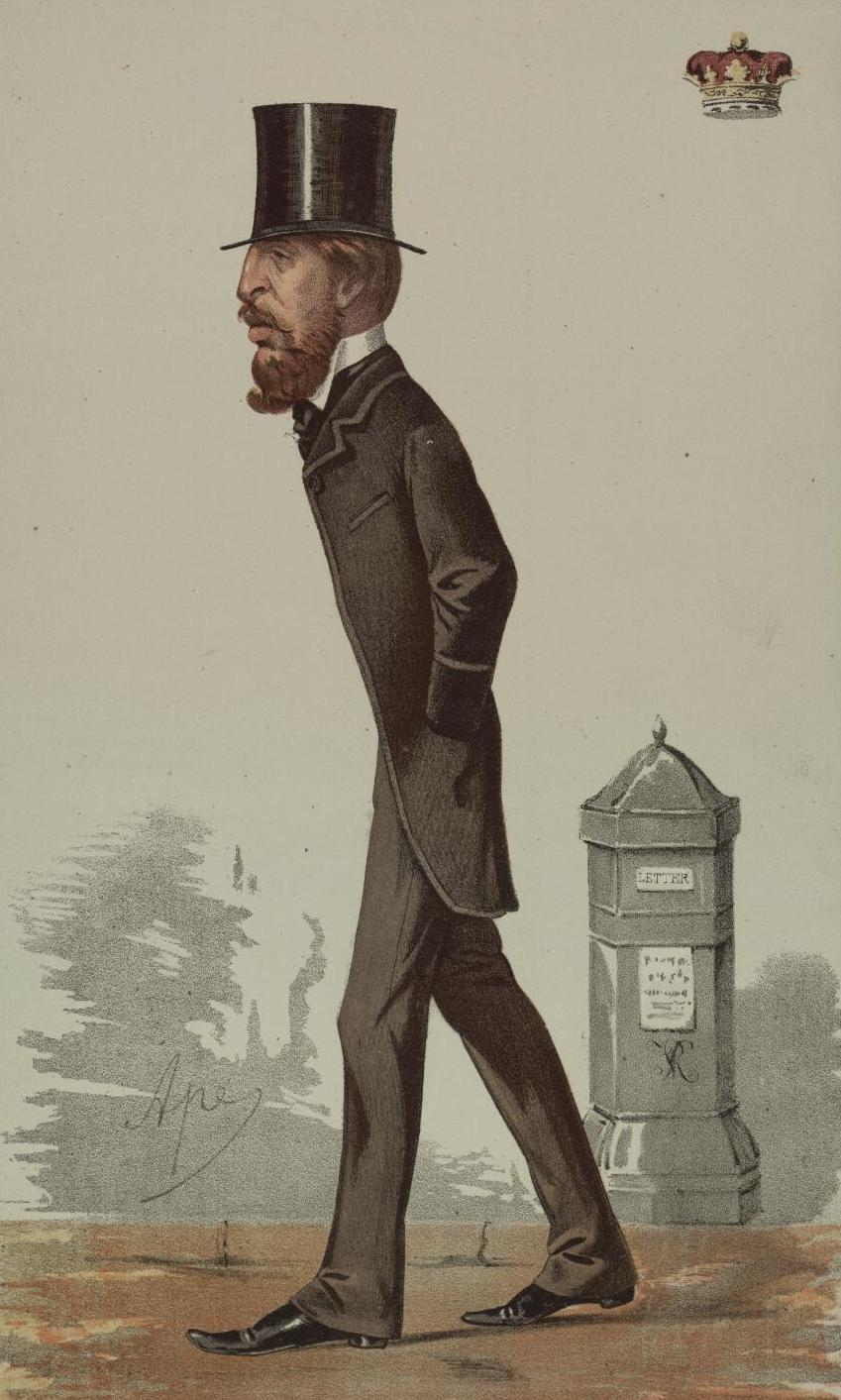
Caricature of Spencer Compton Cavendish by Carlo Pellegrini

Parliament of the United Kingdom
Preceded by John Wilson-Patten; James Heywood	Member of Parliament for North Lancashire; 1857–1868; With: John Wilson-Patten	Succeeded by John Wilson-Patten; Frederick Stanley
Preceded by Richard Green-Price	Member of Parliament for Radnor; 1869–1880	Succeeded by Samuel Williams
Preceded by James Maden Holt; John Starkie	Member of Parliament for North East Lancashire; 1880–1885; With: Frederick William Grafton	Constituency abolished
New constituency	Member of Parliament for Rossendale; 1885–1891	Succeeded by John Maden
Political offices
Preceded by The Earl De Grey and Ripon	Under-Secretary of State for War; 1863–1866	Succeeded by The Lord Dufferin and Clandeboye
Preceded by The Earl De Grey and Ripon	Secretary of State for War; 1866	Succeeded by Jonathan Peel
Preceded by The Duke of Montrose	Postmaster-General; 1868–1871	Succeeded by William Monsell
Preceded by Chichester Fortescue	Chief Secretary for Ireland; 1871–1874	Succeeded by Sir Michael Hicks-Beach, Bt
Preceded by The Viscount Cranbrook	Secretary of State for India; 1880–1882	Succeeded by The Earl of Kimberley
Preceded by Hugh Childers	Secretary of State for War; 1882–1885	Succeeded by William Henry Smith
Preceded by The Earl of Rosebery	Lord President of the Council; 1895–1903	Succeeded by The Marquess of Londonderry
Preceded by The Marquess of Salisbury	Leader of the House of Lords; 1902–1903	Succeeded by The Marquess of Lansdowne
Party political offices
Preceded by William Ewart Gladstone	Leader of the British Liberal Party in the House of Commons; 1875–1880	Succeeded by William Ewart Gladstone
New office	Leader of the Liberal Unionist Association; 1886–1903	Succeeded by Joseph Chamberlain
Preceded by The Marquess of Salisbury	Leader of the Conservative Party in the House of Lords; 1902–1903	Succeeded by The Marquess of Lansdowne
Honorary titles
Preceded by The Duke of Devonshire	Lord Lieutenant of Derbyshire; 1892–1908	Succeeded by The Duke of Devonshire
Preceded by The Marquess of Waterford	Lord Lieutenant of Waterford; 1895–1908	Succeeded by Henry Villiers-Stuart
Academic offices
Preceded by Earl of Derby	Rector of the University of Edinburgh; 1877–1880	Succeeded by Earl of Rosebery
Preceded by The Duke of Devonshire	Chancellor of the University of Cambridge; 1892–1908	Succeeded by The Baron Rayleigh
Peerage of England
Preceded by William Cavendish	Duke of Devonshire; 1891–1908	Succeeded by Victor Cavendish
Professional and academic associations
Preceded by William Cunliffe Brooks	President of the Lancashire and Cheshire Antiquarian Society; 1892–97	Succeeded by Henry Fishwick
