= Frederick William Grafton =

British industrialist and politician

Frederick William Grafton (1816 – 27 January 1890) was a British industrialist and Liberal politician.

He was the eldest son of Joseph Smith Grafton, a Manchester merchant. Following a private education he obtained employment at a calico printing works. He subsequently established his own calico printing business, F.W. Grafton and Company, with premises in at Broad Oak Works, Accrington and Manchester. He was a major employer in the area and was selected as a parliamentary candidate by the Liberal Party at the 1880 general election. He was felt to represent the "commercial class" and was elected to represent North East Lancashire along with Lord Hartington.

When the North East Lancashire seat was split into four divisions by the Redistribution of Seats Act 1885, Grafton was chosen to contest the new Accrington constituency. Although elected as a Liberal, he voted against the government's First Home Rule Bill and joined the Unionist Party. The rejection of the bill led to the dissolution of parliament, and Grafton announced that he would not be standing due to ill health.

Grafton lived at Heysham Hall, Lancaster and Hope Hall, Manchester. He married Emily Sophia Howard in 1850. Frederick Grafton died at his London residence, 7 Kensington Palace Gardens in January 1890, aged 74.

Parliament of the United Kingdom
Preceded by James Maden Holt; John Starkie	Member of Parliament for North East Lancashire; 1880–1885; With: Spencer Cavendish, Marquess of Hartington	Constituency abolished
New constituency	Member of Parliament for Accrington; 1885–1886	Succeeded by Robert Hodge
