= Simonstone, Lancashire =

Village in Lancashire, England

Coordinates: 53.806°N 2.343°W

Simonstone
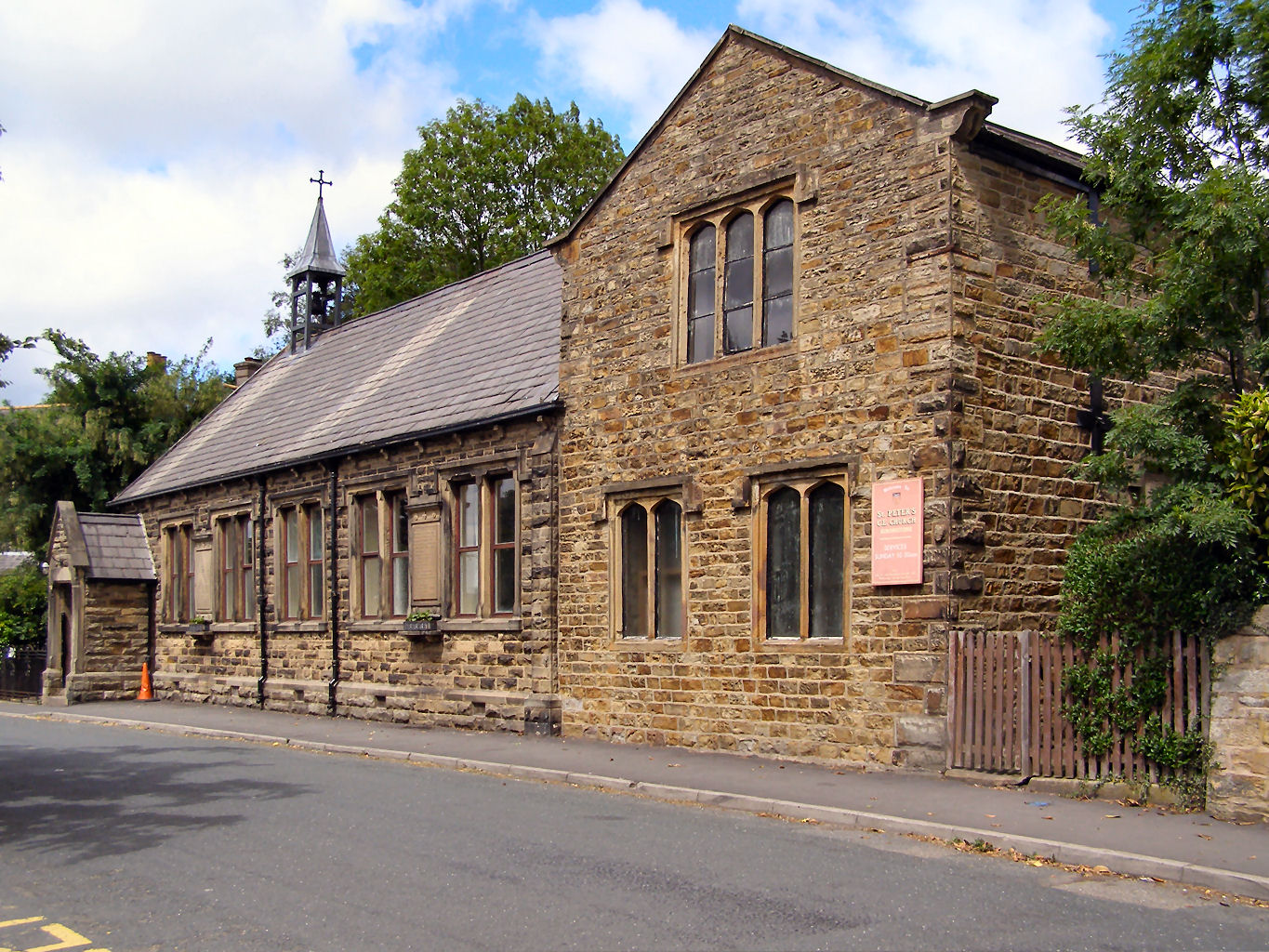
- St Peter's Church, Simonstone

- Shown within Ribble Valley Location within Lancashire
- Population: 1,154 (2011)
- OS grid reference: SD775345
- Civil parish: Simonstone
- District: Ribble Valley
- Shire county: Lancashire
- Region: North West
- Country: England
- Sovereign state: United Kingdom
- Post town: BURNLEY
- Postcode district: BB12
- Dialling code: 01282
- Police: Lancashire
- Fire: Lancashire
- Ambulance: North West
- UK Parliament: Ribble Valley

Simonstone is a small village and civil parish in the Ribble Valley district of Lancashire, England. The population of the civil parish taken at the 2011 census was 1,154. It is about 4 miles (6 km) west of Burnley and south of Pendle Hill and Clitheroe along the A671 road. The village adjoins the village of Read, Lancashire and neighbours Padiham.

== History ==
St Peter's CE Church is the local Church of England building in the village and was founded in 1841. The interior of the building is modern and part is also used as the school hall and gym during the week. The building dates from 1879 and was originally a National School.

== Transport ==
Simonstone railway station was south of the village and closed in 1957.

== Economy ==
The Higher Trapp Hotel is part of the Best Western chain of hotels. It was originally built in the early 1900s as a private house, and now converted into a country hotel with 29 bedrooms.

Granville Technology Group was based in the village, until its closure in 2005.

=== Television manufacture ===
Mullard had a television tube factory, largely a glassmaking factory, from 1955, employing 3,000 by 1974. Cubitts built a new factory from 1955-56. The automatic plant opened in April 1961, being similar to the Philips plant in Eindhoven.

A new plant was installed for colour tubes from 1967. By the end of 1968, 150,000 colour screens would be made. It was 44 acres. In late 1970, Mullard started construction of another colour tube factory at Belmont, County Durham, costing £2.5m, which opened in 1972. It made 2m colour tubes by late 1974. Black and white production ended in 1975. Mullard had other plants at Southampton. The Southampton site, on the Millbrook Trading Estate, of Mullard developed infrared detectors; part of this moved to NXP Semiconductors at Romsey.

The site was loss-making by 1976. By 1977 Mullard was the only television tube manufacturer in the UK. The industry was represented by the Radio Industry Council.

The other main television tube factories were Thorn EMI at Sunderland and Skelmersdale, which closed in 1976.

The site became Philips Components Ltd in 1988, and LG Philips Displays in 2001. The closure was announced in December 2003, and closed in April 2004.

== Governance ==
Simonstone was once a township in the ancient parish of Whalley. This became a civil parish in 1866, forming part of the Burnley Rural District from 1894 to 1974. With the creation of the new local government districts in 1974 Simonstone was included in Borough of Burnley. However, after a public campaign and Boundary Commission review completed in 1985, it subsequently became part of the Borough of Ribble Valley. During the process the neighbouring civil parish of Northtown was abolished with part transferred to Simonstone, and small adjustments occurred to the boundaries with Padiham and Altham along the river.

Together with Read, the parish forms the Read and Simonstone ward of Ribble Valley Borough Council.

== Landmarks ==
=== Huntroyde Hall ===
Huntroyde Hall was originally built for Edmund Starkie in the 16th-century and has since been modified many times. Its estate, Huntroyde Demesne (known locally as 'Huntroyde') separates Simonstone from Padiham. The house remained in the ownership of the Starkie family until 1983.

=== Simonstone Hall ===
The Hall dates from the 17th century and was originally the home of the Whitaker family. It is a privately owned listed building. The house was substantially re-built in the 18th century as an early example of Jacobean revival architecture. Ancillary buildings include a 17th-century barn and an 18th-century stables.

== Education ==
St Peter's CE Primary School is the village's only school, with around 120 pupils. The school hosts several village events throughout the year, including the 'School Gala' (or Summer Fair) held late in June. The village is in the catchment area of the Clitheroe Royal Grammar School.

== See also ==
- Listed buildings in Simonstone, Lancashire
