= Huntroyde Hall =

House in Lancashire, England

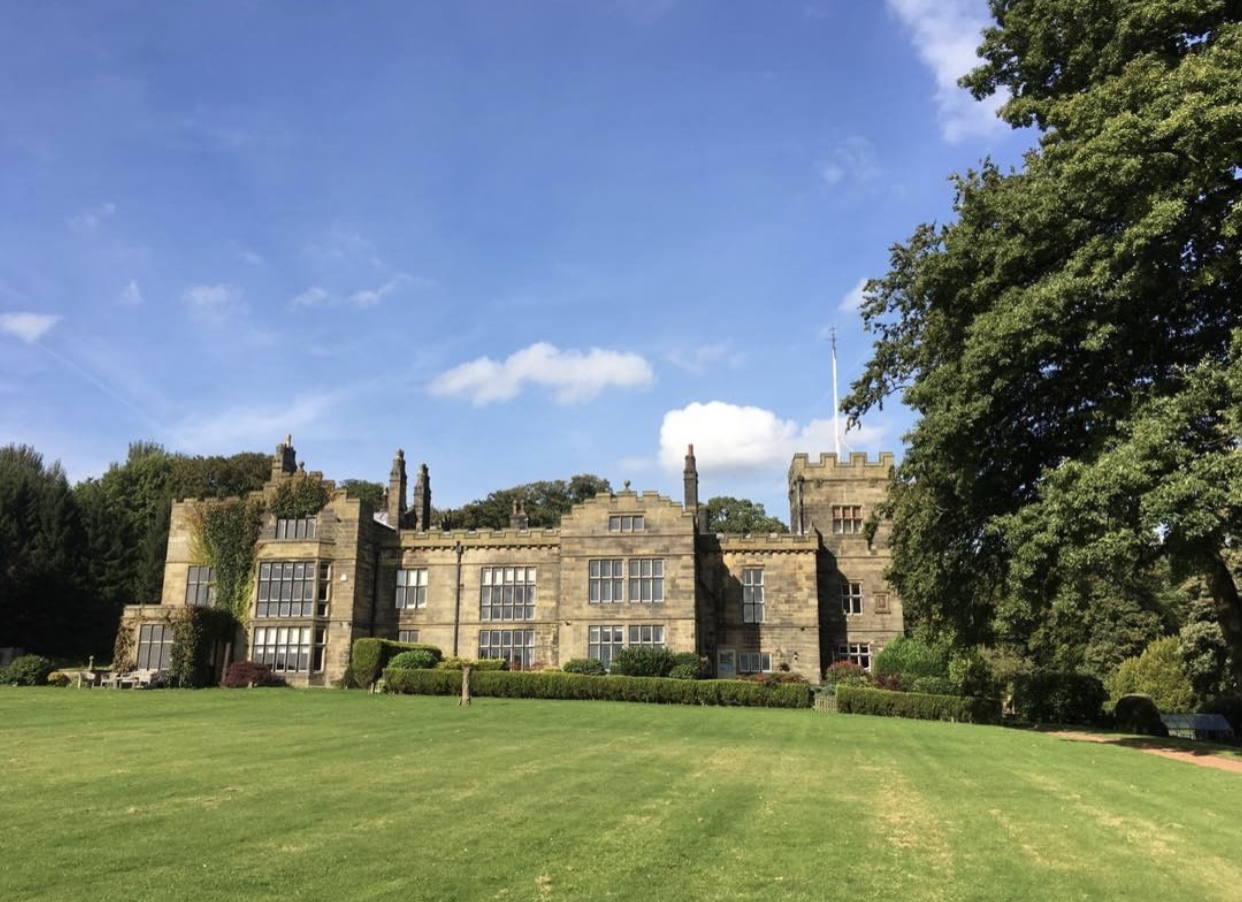
- Viewed from the south lawn (April 2017)

- Location within the Borough of Ribble Valley
- 53.8121°N 2.3263°W
- Location: Simonstone, Ribble Valley, Lancashire

Listed Building – Grade II
- Official name: Huntroyde
- Designated: 1 April 1953

Listed Building – Grade II
- Official name: Ha-ha circa 100M south of Huntroyde
- Designated: 12 February 1985

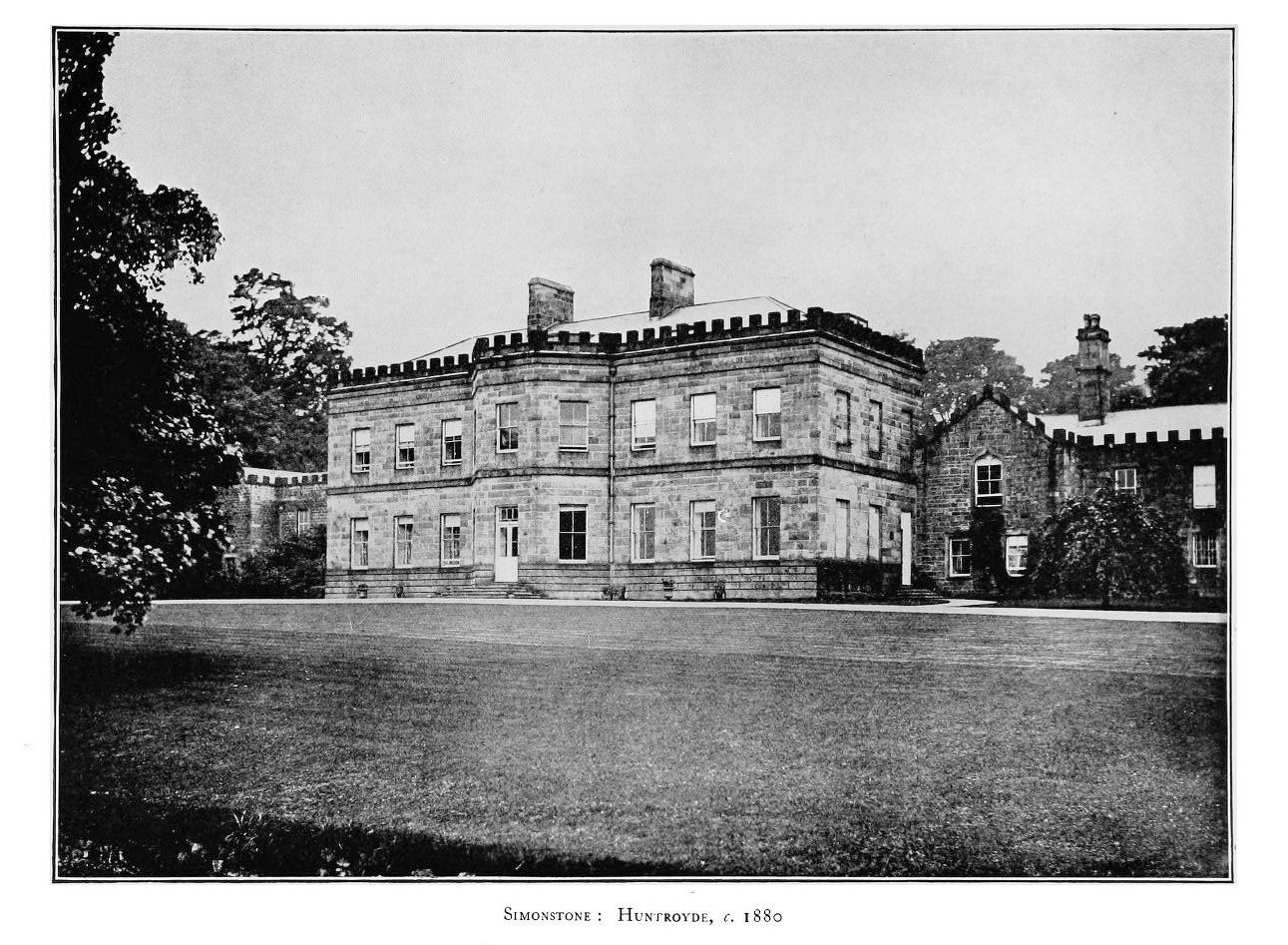
Huntroyde Hall c.1880

Huntroyde Hall is a grade II listed, 16th-century house in the civil parish of Simonstone in the Borough of Ribble Valley, Lancashire, England. Its estate, Huntroyde Demesne (known locally as 'Huntroyde'), once extended to over 6,500 acres.

Huntroyde Hall is reputed to stand on the site of a hunting lodge once owned by John O' Gaunt. The Huntroyde Hall Estate came to the Starkie family by marriage in circa.1464. The first recorded house was constructed on an H-shaped plan in 1576 for the Starkie family and re-built in the Georgian style in the mid-19th century. Wings added to the west side in 1777 and 1850 have since been demolished. The remaining part of the house was re-faced in ashlar sandstone in 1885. Huntroyde Hall features a Grade II listed Ha-Ha, one of the longest in the North of England.

== History ==
=== Huntroyde Hall ===
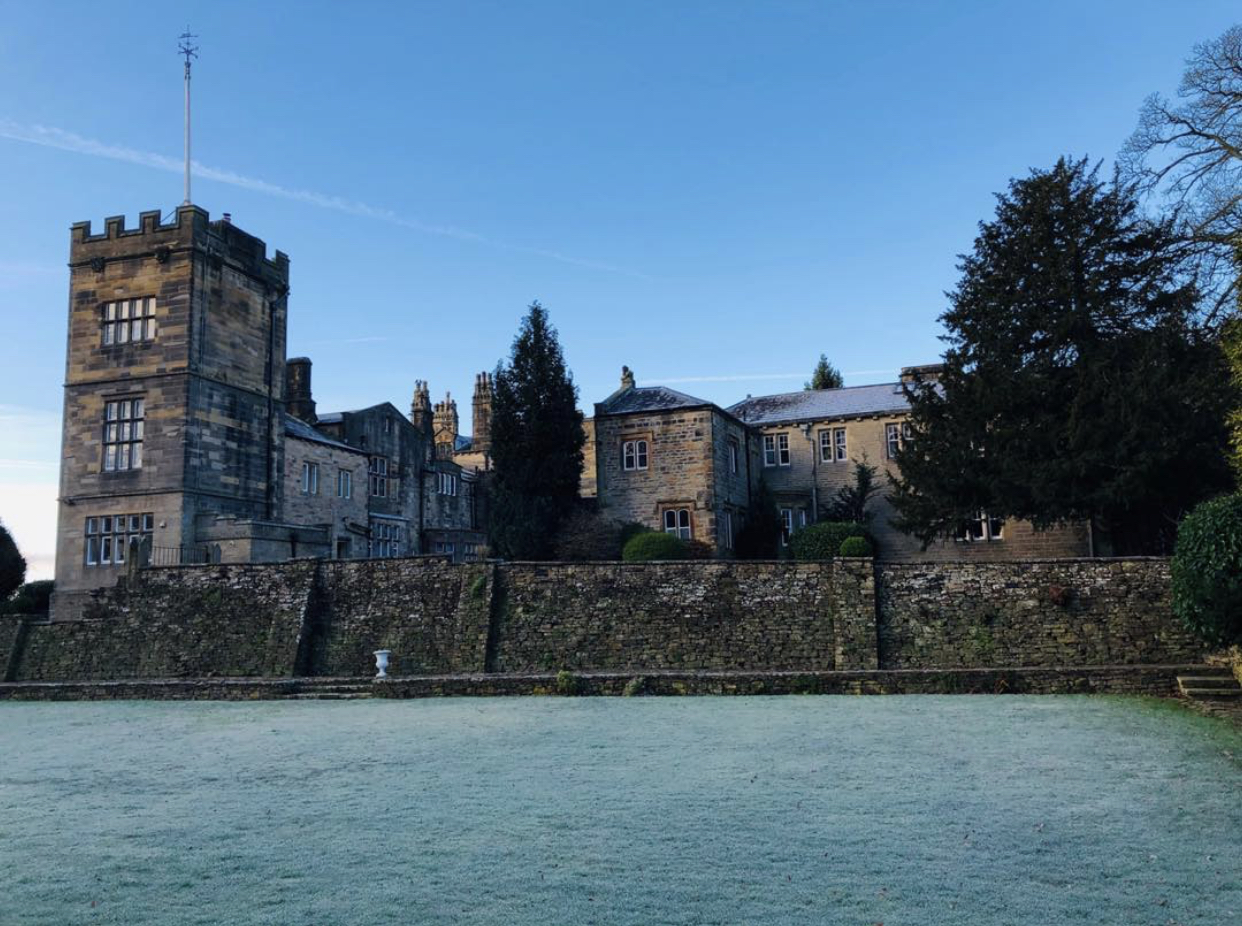
Huntroyde Hall East Wing

A hall was built for Edmund Starkie in 1576. (Note: Datestones inscribed "ES 1576" were recorded in the early 20th century.) It is thought to have been of a typical design for the period, approximately 24.5 metres (80 ft) wide and of two storeys with a central hall, and mullioned windows. Wings at both ends projected 2.5 metres (8 ft) at the front and rear. The central hall was about 10.7 metres (35 ft) by 6 metres (20 ft) with entrances at either end of a passageway at its western side.

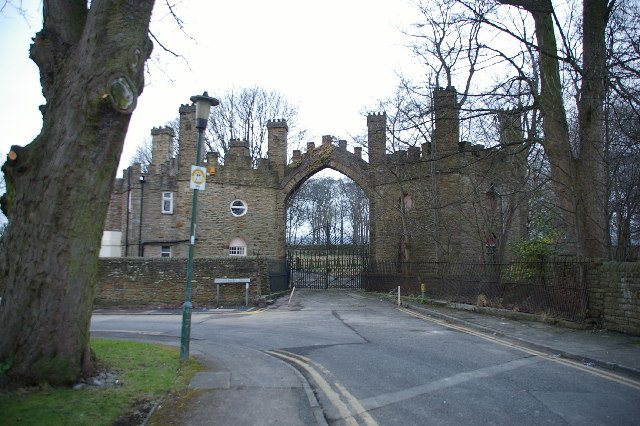
Huntroyde Hall's Original Gatehouse (now detached from house and grounds)

In 1631 a gatehouse was constructed aligned to the northern entrance, (Note: When the gatehouse was rebuilt a datestone was retained, inscribed "J.S. 1631 M.S.", this is likely for John Starkie (1584–1665) who married Margaret Leigh in 1602.) and a full-width walled courtyard about 14.3 metres (47 ft) deep was created. A plan from 1777 shows further alterations. An extension was built along the eastern side and the courtyard had a stable block and other outbuildings. The northwest projection had been widened to incorporate a staircase in the hall and a new south-facing entrance in the north-west corner. The old south entrance was replaced by a window and a larger doorway into the hall was located centrally.

The plan documents the major building program commenced for Le Gendre Starkie (c.1735–1792). (Note: Datestones in the new wing where inscribed "LGS 1777") In 1777 a wing was constructed extending 28 metres (92 ft) west from the south-west corner of the building. It was constructed in the Georgian style in ashlar sandstone with sash windows and a hipped roof. Alterations were made to the west end of the old hall to connect it to the new. Around 1789 the old outbuildings were replaced with a servants' wing, fully enclosing that side of the courtyard. The exterior was given ornamental battlements and sash windows replacements. In early 19th century images of the hall is another wing extending west from the 1777 extension. It mirrors the old hall and added balance when viewed from the south. This wing was replaced in 1850. The new building contained a library, entrance hall supported by marble pillars and a smoking room.

In 1879 a range of stores and offices was erected to the north side of the old courtyard, incorporating a 2nd gatehouse to the south. (Note: The first Ordnance Survey map of the area, suggests that some of this work may have been completed by the late 1840s.) Between 1885 and 1888, the old building underwent further restoration, the front was refaced in ashlar, the sash windows replaced with larger mullions. The north side was largely rebuilt including a first floor billiards room.

The house was partially demolished in 1969 and 1970 to reduce it to a more manageable size and was sold in 1983.

The estate is private but corporate events such as simulated game shooting and clay pigeon shooting are held in the grounds. The estate is fragmented by public footpaths, roads and farms. The gatehouse or lodge to the hall, known as Arbory Hall, is in Arbory Drive, Padiham near the cricket field. It was built in 1790 and is now a private residence.

=== Starkie Family ===
In 1465, Edmund Starkie of Barnton near Northwich in Cheshire married Elizabeth de Simonstone the heiress of the land at Huntroyde.

In 1578 Nicholas Starkie (born c.1566), son and heir of Edmund, the builder of Huntroyde married Anne Parr, the heiress of estates at Kempnough in Worsley and Cleworth Hall in Tyldesley that in 1596 was associated with witchcraft. His son John (1584–1665) inherited the estate in 1618 and went on to become one of the Chief Justices of the Peace in Lancashire and Sheriff of Lancaster. His eldest son Nicholas, a captain in the Parliamentary army, inherited but was killed in 1643 by the gunpowder explosion at the siege of Hoghton Tower. In 1651 an estate was purchased at Kearsley, south of Bolton. Nicholas' son John was High Sheriff of Lancashire in 1656 and died in 1676. He had married Alice Norris in 1654 and through her inherited Hall i' th' Wood in Bolton. The estate passed to John's son John and then to John jnr's son Piers.

Piers expanded the family's landholdings further with the estates of Rogerstead in the Heaton area of Bolton (1726), Shuttleworth in Hapton (1734), Snydale, Westhoughton (1744), Coldcoats, Pendleton, Sunderland, Balderstone (1756), Lovely, Salesbury (1757), and (Great) Mearley in Mearley (1758). However he died childless in 1760 and left the estate to his cousin's son Le Gendre Starkie (c.1735–1792), after which is passed to Le Gendre's son, Le Gendre Piers Starkie (1760–1807), who was High Sheriff of Lancashire in 1806. The Starkie's were major landowners in Heyhouses (now part of Sabden) from at least 1787 and in 1801 Le Gendre Piers Starkie purchased the remaining portion. Over Pendleton Moor, Little Pendleton was purchased in 1807 and Wymondhouses in two lots in 1809 and 1811. Both these estates neighbour Coldcoats.

The estate was then inherited by the latter's son Le Gendre Starkie (1790–1822), High Sheriff in 1815 and after his early death by his younger brother Le Gendre Nicholas Starkie (1799–1865), Member of Parliament for Pontefract from 1826 to 1832 and a prominent Freemason, being Provincial Grand Master for the Western Division of Lancashire. His son, Le Gendre Nicholas Starkie (1828–1899), was High Sheriff in 1868 and MP for Clitheroe from 1853 to 1856. Also a prominent Freemason, he was Provincial Grand Master for the Eastern Division of Lancashire from 1870 to 1899. In 1876 Kempnough Hall was sold to the Bridgewater Trustees. Rogerstead was sold to the Bolton Corporation in 1879, becoming one of the town's cemeteries. Hall i' th' Wood was sold in 1899, becoming a museum.

He left the estate to his son Edmund Arthur Le Gendre Starkie (1871–1958). Edmund served as Captain in the Boer War and was a local promoter of the Red Cross and St John's Ambulance Brigade and by 1914 had developed parts of the Huntroyde grounds into a major tree plantation. He allowed Huntroyd to be used as a hospital for convalescent soldiers during the First World War. After Edmund's death in 1958, the estate passed to his nephew, Guy Le Gendre Starkie (1909–1985).

== See also ==
- Listed buildings in Simonstone, Lancashire
- Le Gendre Starkie (1799–1865)
- Le Gendre Starkie (1828–1899)
- John Pierce Chamberlain Starkie (1830-1888)
