= North East Lancashire =

Parliamentary constituency in the United Kingdom, 1868–1885

- Former county constituency for the House of Commons

1868–1885
- Seats: two
- Created from: North Lancashire
- Replaced by: Accrington; Clitheroe; Darwen; Rossendale

North East Lancashire was a county constituency of the House of Commons of the Parliament of the United Kingdom. The constituency was created by the Reform Act 1867 and replaced the North Lancashire Parliamentary constituency, a county division with two seats.

It was represented by two Members of Parliament. The new North East division of Lancashire comprised the hundred of Blackburn, apart from the areas included within the Parliamentary boroughs of Burnley and Blackburn. The area of the modern Hyndburn constituency, which lies between the two towns of Burnley and Blackburn, was therefore represented by the two MPs for the North East Lancashire division as a result of these changes.

Boundary Commission Review 1868

The 1868 review carried out by the Boundary Commission followed the Representation of the People Act 1867. This Act appointed the commission to inquire into the boundaries of the new boroughs created by the Act; the counties the Act had newly divided, and to review all other existing boroughs that had not been disenfranchised by the Act. In inquiring into existing boroughs, the commission had the power to recommend extension of borough boundaries if it thought this was appropriate. This Act also increased the number of Members representing each of the growing industrial cities of Birmingham, Manchester, Liverpool and Leeds, from two to three. The Commissioners conducted local inquiries and reported in 1868.

In Lancashire, as well as the additional Members for Liverpool and Manchester, Salford also gained an extra seat, taking it to two Members. Burnley was created as a Parliamentary borough with the right to return a single Member. Lancaster was abolished as a Parliamentary borough as a result of corrupt practices at the previous general election. The boundaries of the following Parliamentary boroughs were altered but the number of Members remained the same as constituted by the 1832 reforms: Ashton-under-Lyne, Blackburn, Bolton, Oldham, Preston and Rochdale.

The county divisions of Lancashire were further divided. From 1868 there were four divisions of the county, each returning two Members. The boundaries were first used in the election that occurred in the November and December 1868 and they gave Lancashire a total of 32 Members of Parliament across the county. (In this review Stalybridge, which was partly in Cheshire and partly in Lancashire, was granted the status of a Parliamentary borough but is not considered part of Lancashire for this note).

The constituency was abolished by the Redistribution of Seats Act 1885, being divided into the single member divisions of Accrington, Darwen and Rossendale.

== Members of Parliament ==
- Constituency created (1868)

Election	1st Member	1st Party	2nd Member	2nd Party
1868	James Maden Holt	Conservative	John Starkie	Conservative
1880	Marquess of Hartington	Liberal	Frederick William Grafton	Liberal

- Constituency abolished (1885)

== Elections ==
=== Elections in the 1860s ===
General election 1868: North East Lancashire
Party	Candidate	Votes	%	±%
Conservative	James Maden Holt	3,612	25.6	
Conservative	John Starkie	3,594	25.5	
Liberal	Ughtred Kay-Shuttleworth	3,463	24.5	
Liberal	William Fenton	3,441	24.4	
Majority		131	1.0	
Turnout		7,055 (est)	81.6 (est)	
Registered electors		10,250		
Conservative win (new seat)				
Conservative win (new seat)				

=== Elections in the 1870s ===
General election 1874: North East Lancashire
Party	Candidate	Votes	%	±%
Conservative	James Maden Holt	4,578	25.8	+0.2
Conservative	John Starkie	4,488	25.3	−0.2
Liberal	James Kay-Shuttleworth	4,401	24.8	+0.3
Liberal	Edward Cavendish	4,297	24.2	−0.2
Majority		87	0.5	−0.5
Turnout		8,882 (est)	86.7 (est)	+5.1
Registered electors		10,250		
Conservative hold		Swing	+0.2	
Conservative hold		Swing	−0.3	

=== Elections in the 1880s ===
General election 1880: North East Lancashire
Party	Candidate	Votes	%	±%
Liberal	Marquess of Hartington	6,682	28.3	+3.5
Liberal	Frederick William Grafton	6,513	27.6	+3.4
Conservative	William Farrer Ecroyd	5,231	22.2	−3.6
Conservative	John Starkie	5,185	22.0	−3.3
Majority		1,497	6.3	N/A
Majority		1,282	5.4	N/A
Turnout		11,806 (est)	90.9 (est)	+4.2
Registered electors		12,991		
Liberal gain from Conservative		Swing	+3.6	
Liberal gain from Conservative		Swing	+3.4	

Cavendish was appointed Secretary of State for India, requiring a by-election.

By-election, 17 May 1880: North East Lancashire
Party	Candidate	Votes	%	±%
Liberal	Marquess of Hartington	Unopposed		
Liberal hold				

== Sources ==
- Leigh Rayment's Historical List of MPs – Constituencies beginning with "L" (part 1)
