= Padiham =

Town in Lancashire, England

Coordinates: 53.797°N 2.311°W

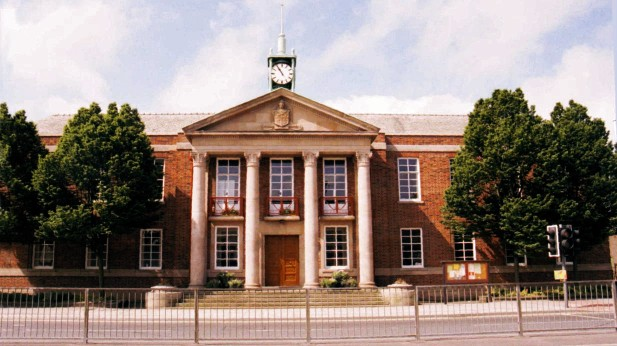
- Padiham Town Hall in 1994, designed by Bradshaw Gass & Hope 1938

- Shown within Burnley Borough Location within Lancashire
- Area: 2.46 sq mi (6.4 km^{2})
- Population: 10,098 (2011)
  - Density: 4,105/sq mi (1,585/km^{2})
- OS grid reference: SD7933
- Civil parish: Padiham
- District: Burnley
- Shire county: Lancashire
- Region: North West
- Country: England
- Sovereign state: United Kingdom
- Post town: BURNLEY
- Postcode district: BB12
- Dialling code: 01282
- Police: Lancashire
- Fire: Lancashire
- Ambulance: North West
- UK Parliament: Burnley

Church Street looking north from St Leonard's, c. 1900. The Old Black Bull is next to the church. The view has hardly changed, but unlike some others, the street is no longer cobbled.

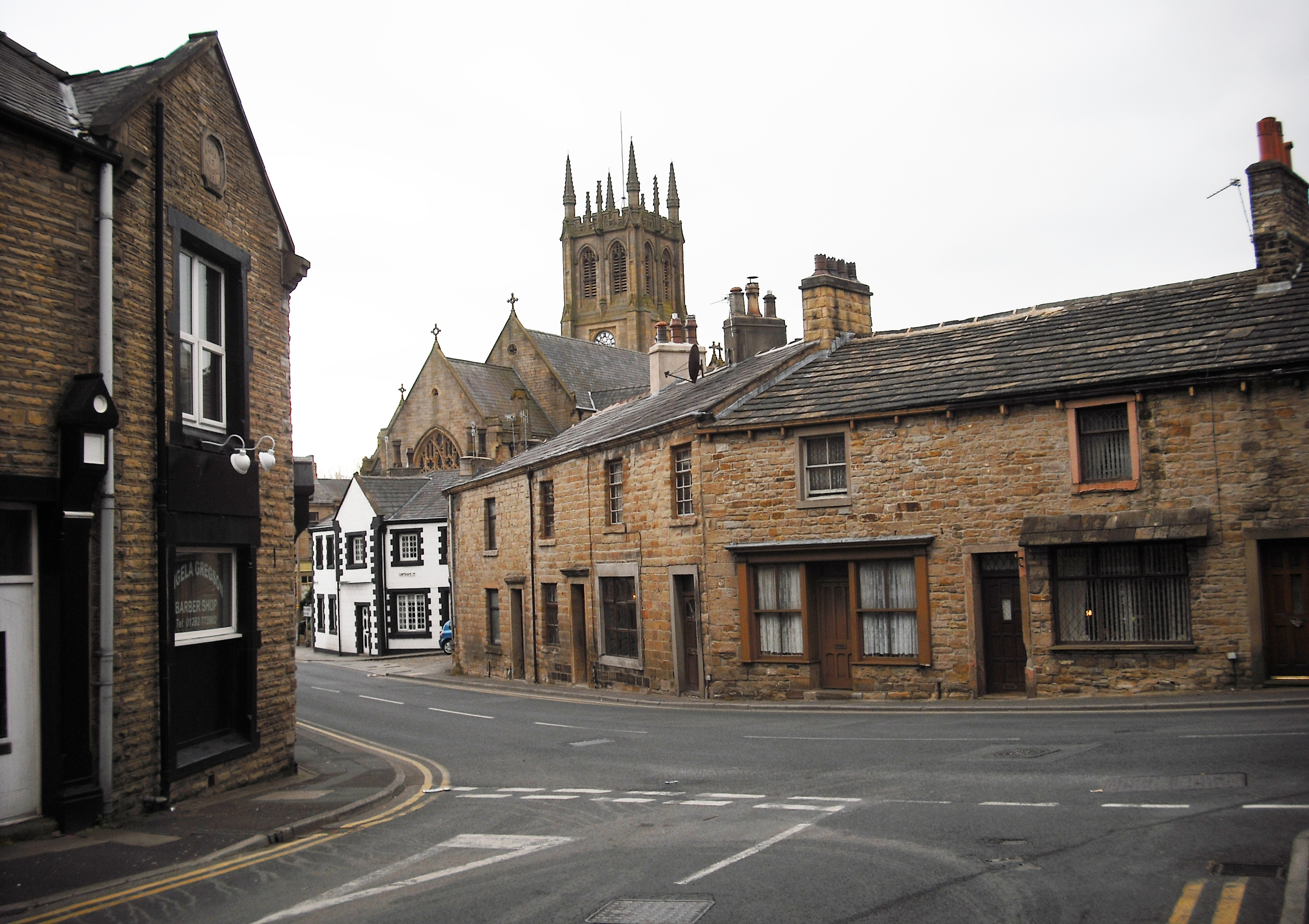
St Leonard's Church, from Guy Street

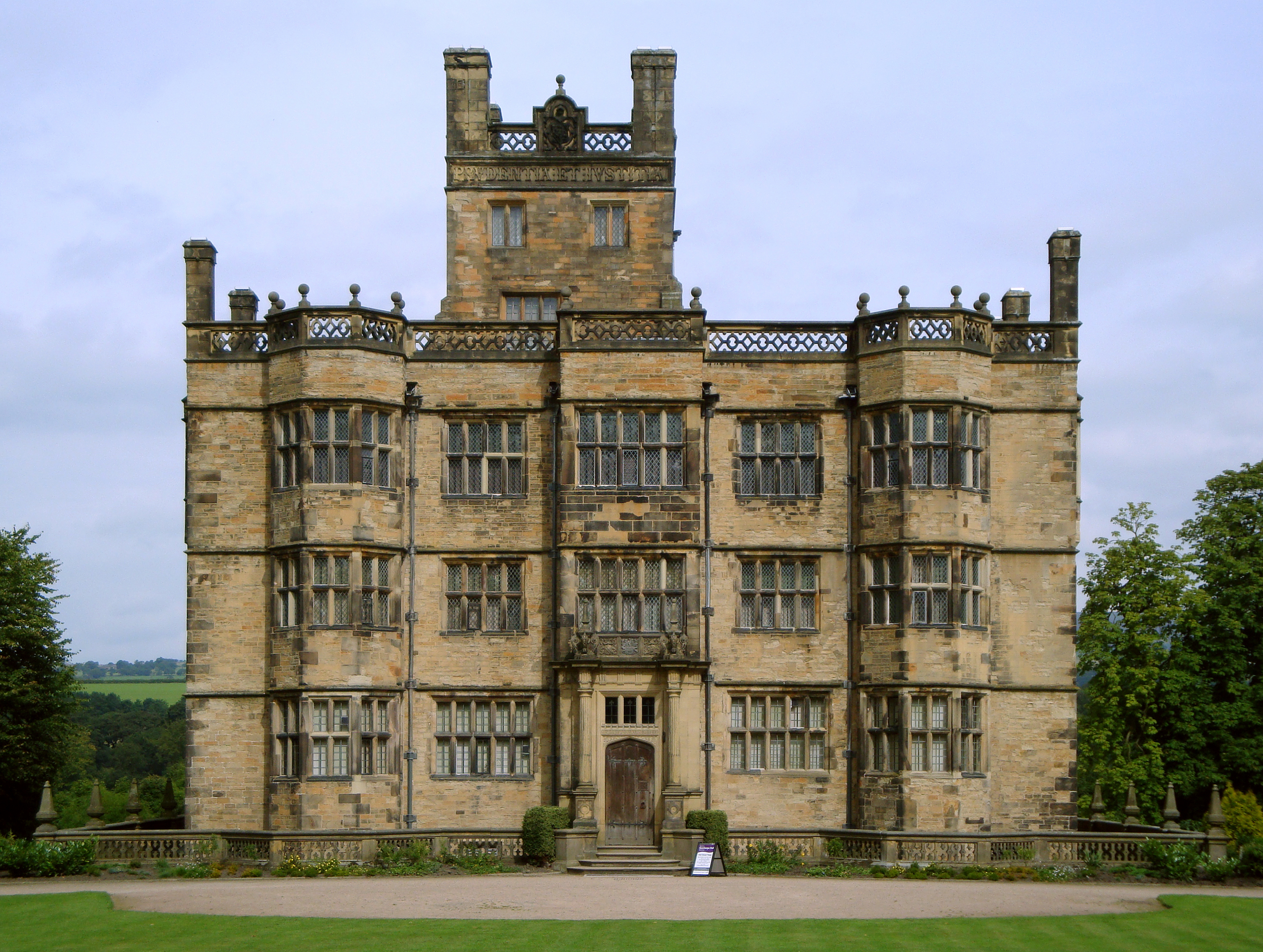
Gawthorpe Hall in Padiham. Owned by National Trust but jointly managed with Lancashire County Council.

Padiham (/ˈpædiəm/ PAD-i-əm) is a market town and civil parish on the River Calder, in the Borough of Burnley in Lancashire, England. It is located north west of Burnley, and north east of the towns of Clayton le Moors and Great Harwood. It is edged by the foothills of Pendle Hill to the north-west and north-east. The United Kingdom Census 2011 gave a parish population of 10,098, estimated in 2019 at 10,138.

== History ==
Early forms of the name include "Padingham", with the last element probably from the Old English word hām, meaning home and ing in this sense meaning "of the". Its first is generally thought to be a personal name: Bede listed Padda as one of the priests who assisted Bishop Wilfrid in the late 7th century.

No prehistoric or Roman sites have been found in the built-up area. Padiham, though a name of Anglo-Saxon origin, is not recorded in the 1086 Domesday Book. Padiham was never a separate manor, its lands largely being held by copyhold tenants of the Manor of Ightenhill, a part of the Honour of Clitheroe. In 1258 there was a single free tenant, one Gilbert de Padiham. The Lord of Clitheroe had established a water-powered corn mill here by 1311. It remained for centuries as a market town, where produce from Pendleside was bought and sold. The town expanded and was redeveloped during the Industrial Revolution. The centre is now a conservation area.

Padiham's population peaked around 1921 at about 14,000, declining to 10,000 in the early 1960s and 8,998 at the time of the 2001 census. This reflected how people were moving to the south of England in search of work, after the decline in the traditional cotton, coal and engineering manufacturing industries.

Queen Elizabeth II and Prince Philip first visited Burnley, Nelson and the old Mullard valve factory at Simonstone near Padiham on their post-Coronation tour of Lancashire in 1955.

== Governance ==
Padiham, once a township in the parish of Whalley, became a civil parish in 1866. An urban district covered the town from 1894 until 1974, but over this time, some rural areas mainly to the north became a new civil parish, Northtown, as part of Burnley Rural District. The Padiham Green area, hitherto part of Hapton, (Note: The old township boundary with Hapton followed the River Calder and its tributary, Green Brook.) joined Padiham, with another small area following in 1935. Since 1974 Padiham has formed part of the Borough of Burnley. Initially part of an unparished area, a new Padiham civil parish was formed in late 2001, covering a similar area to the old urban district. A Town Council was instituted in 2002. Further boundary changes in 2004 saw the parish gain more territory in the south from Hapton.

Councillors for Padiham on Burnley Borough Council are elected to the Gawthorpe Ward, which covers most of Padiham, but not Gawthorpe Hall, with southern and eastern areas covered by Hapton with Park Ward. The two wards each elect three councillors, John Harbour and Alun Lewis of the Labour Party and Karen Ingham (Conservative) currently serving Gawthorpe and Joanne Broughton, Alan Hosker, and Jamie McGowan, all of the Conservatives in Hapton with Park. The parish is represented on Lancashire County Council as part of the Padiham & Burnley West division, represented since 2017 by Alan Hosker. The Parliamentary Constituency, Burnley, is currently represented by Oliver Ryan for the Labour Party.

== Demography ==
According to the United Kingdom Census 2011, the parish had a population of 10,098, an increase from 8,998 in the 2001 census. The town forms part of a wider urban area, which had a population of 149,796 in 2001. A similar but larger, Burnley Built-up area defined in the 2011 census had a population of 149,422.

The racial composition of the town in 2011 was 98.1% White (96.6% White British), 1.1% Asian, 0.1% Black, 0.5% Mixed and 0.1% Other. The largest religious groups were Christian (70.0%) and Muslim (0.6%). 68.3% of adults between the ages of 16 and 74 were classed as economically active and in work.

Year	1901	1911	1921	1931	1939	1951	1961	2001	2011
Population	12,205	13,635	12,471	11,633	10,011	10,041	9,899	8,998	10,098
UD (pre-1974) CP (2001 onwards)

== Economy ==
In the 19th century, Padiham's industry was based on coal-mining and weaving. Helm Mill on Factory Lane was the first mill built in 1807. By 1906 there were twenty cotton mills though the best preserved, now converted into flats, is Victoria Mill in Ightenhill Street, built in 1852–1853 and extended in 1873. Many cotton workers belonged to the Padiham Weavers' Association, whose membership peaked in 1907 at over 6,000.

Industrial development was helped by proximity to the Leeds and Liverpool Canal, about 2 miles (3.2 km) to the south. By 1848, Padiham had many coal pits around the town, including two large collieries and a number of smaller workings. Availability of coal and water nearby helped to boost the cotton industry. Industry benefited further from the arrival of the railway at Hapton in 1840 and Padiham itself in 1877. The last pit closed about 1870, although mining continued in areas outside the town into the 1950s, and open cast mining took place in the 1960s east of the town close to Gawthorpe Hall, north of the River Calder off Grove Lane.

Since the 1960s, the remaining cotton mills have continued a decline that began in the 1930s. So too has Padiham's role as a manufacturing base since the 1990s. The town's last major employer in the sector, Baxi, closed its factory in March 2007, with a loss of 500 jobs. A modern business park, Shuttleworth Mead, opened in 2001 on the western edge of the town where Padiham Power Station had stood until 1993. The business park has been supported by £2.2 million from the European Regional Development Fund and £2 million from the North West Development Agency. Tenants include Supanet, an Internet service provider and Graham & Brown, a wall coverings company.

In 2007 Fort Vale Engineering developed a new purpose-built factory, where the old Mullard/Philips site at Calder Vale Park, Simonstone had closed in 2004. Fort Vale Engineering employs some 280 local people and has brought business to other local employers.

== Landmarks ==
There are five significant mansions in the local area: Huntroyde Hall, dating from 1576, and Simonstone Hall, dating from 1660, in nearby Simonstone, are still privately owned. Gawthorpe Hall was donated to the National Trust in 1970, but is jointly managed with Lancashire County Council under a 99-year lease. Gawthorpe is in the Ightenhill district. The National Trust also runs an office and a tearoom in the courtyard of the property. Gawthorpe was owned by the Shuttleworth family, which held Shuttleworth Hall near Hapton from the 12th century. The current building dates from 1639 and is still a working farm. Read Hall and Park is in the nearby village of Read, about 1 mile (1.6 km) west of Padiham on the A671.

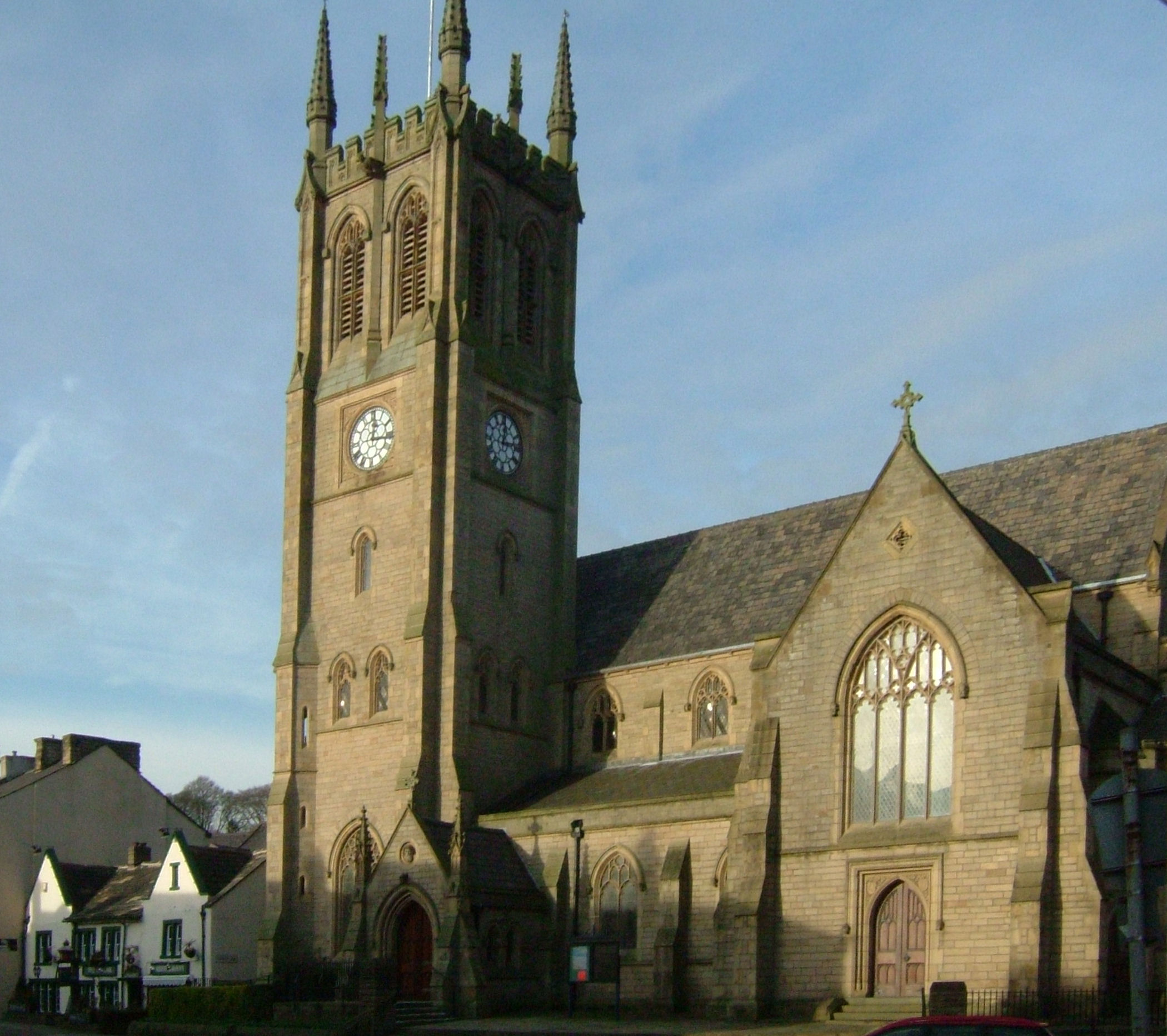
St Leonard's Parish Church

St Leonard's Parish Church dates from 1866 to 1869 and is a Grade II listed building. It occupies the site of earlier churches dating back to 1451 or earlier. The original churchyard was smaller in extent than today, being expanded to the northern edge in 1835.

Padiham Town Hall in Burnley Road, built in 1938 to designs by Bradshaw Gass & Hope, is a Grade II listed building.

Padiham Memorial Park at the top of Church Street, was designed by Thomas Mawson, a prolific landscape designer. It was officially opened in 1921 as a memorial to those of the town who gave their lives in the First World War. It now commemorates victims of the Second World War as well.

The park covers 12 acres (4.9 ha) on two sites divided by the River Calder. The upper section is mainly formal, dominated by Knight Hill House, currently used as an Age UK (formerly Age Concern) day centre, and has a rose garden, lawns and two memorials. The lower section, off Park Street, has two bowling greens, tennis courts, skate park and Padiham Leisure Centre. The park is a Green Flag award winner. The park still had remains of some Second World War air raid shelters in 2008.

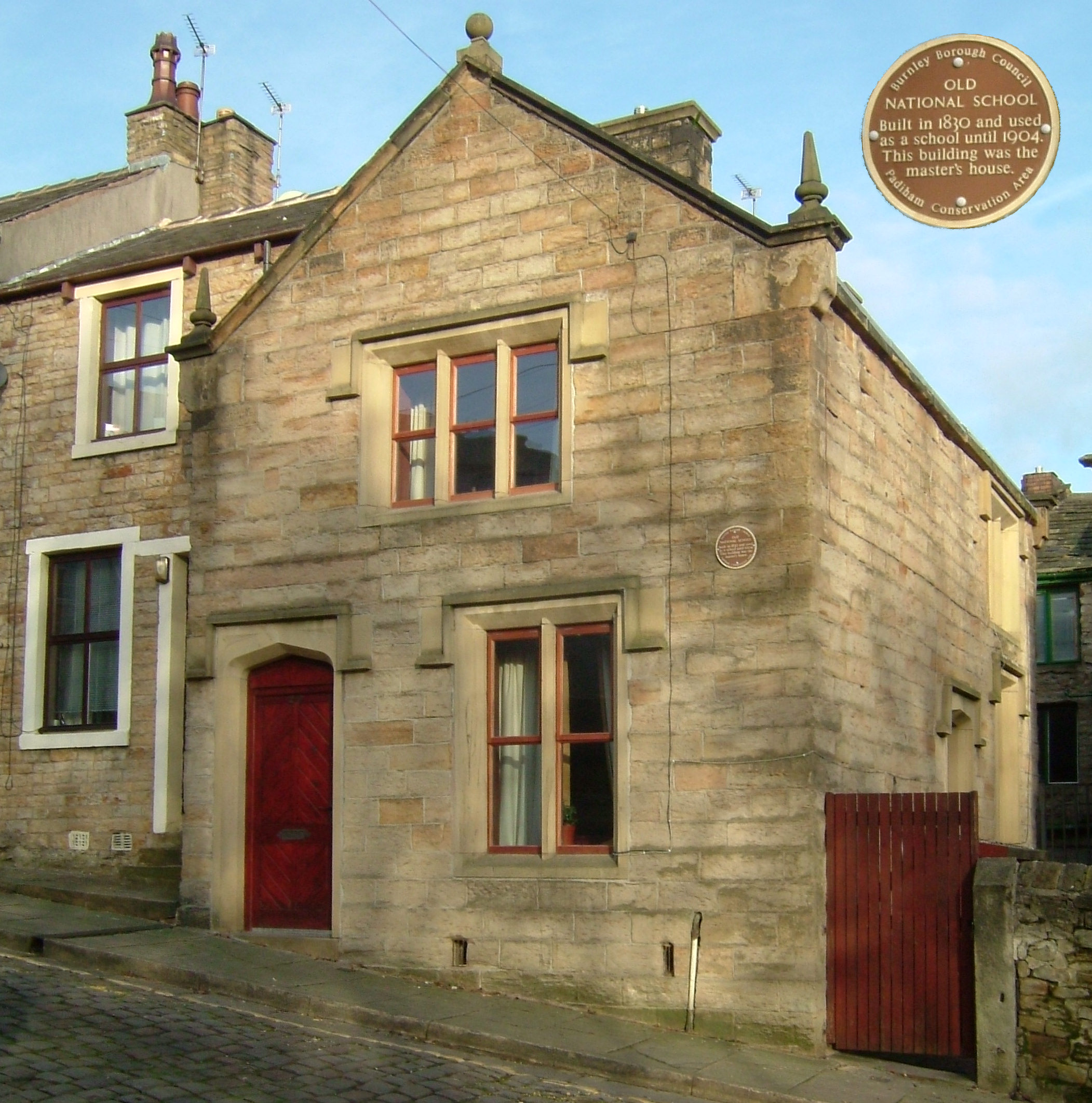
The old National School, Mill Street, built in 1830 and used until 1904

Another locally listed building is the former Padiham Building Society headquarters. A detached building over two storeys with large underground vault on Burnley Road, constructed between 1955-1958 and officially opened in 1959. The building was recently renovated by local businessman Liam Veitch and converted into individual office spaces.

Padiham War Memorial itself is at the main park entrance in Blackburn Road. There is a second memorial at All Saints' with St John the Baptist off the A671, Padiham Road, opposite the George IV pub. A local man, Thomas Clayton, funded the park in his will; public subscription provided additional money for the park's many features.

Near the war memorial, the Air Crash Memorial recalls several local young people killed on 3 July 1970, when a Dan Air de Havilland Comet deviated from its course and crashed into the high ground of the Montseny Range in north-eastern Spain – see: Dan-Air Flight 1903. The aircraft, destroyed on impact and by subsequent ground fire, contained three flight crew, four cabin crew and 105 passengers, all of whom died. It was the airline's first fatal accident involving fare-paying passengers. The tour operator, Clarksons Holidays, was at the time Britain's largest package holiday company.

Several other buildings in the area are also of historic interest. Hargrove can be seen from a public footpath off the Padiham by-pass just north of the town and the 1950s council housing estate north of Windermere Road. For over 400 years it was the home of the Webster family of yeoman farmers. The house is probably 17th century and part of the Huntroyed estate. Coal from a local outcrop heated the house for many years. Stockbridge House in Victoria Road was occupied by the Holts, a farming family, in 1802 and has a Jacobean chimney. High Whitaker Farm is north-east of Hargrove, accessible by public footpath from Higham Road and from Grove Lane. The building is 16th century and said to have been used to hide Catholics during the reign of Henry VIII. Other houses of note are Priddy Bank Farm and Foulds House Farm, both off Sabden Road, and Arbory Lodge on Arbory Drive.

== Media ==
Local news and television programmes are provided by BBC North West and ITV Granada. Television signals are received from the Winter Hill TV transmitter and the local relay TV transmitter located in the Forest of Pendle.

Local radio stations are BBC Radio Lancashire, Heart North West, Smooth North West, Central Radio North West, Greatest Hits Radio Lancashire and Capital Manchester and Lancashire (formerly 2BR).

The town is served by the local newspapers, Burnley Express and Lancashire Telegraph.

Between 1994 and 1996 three series of the BBC One comedy drama series All Quiet on the Preston Front was filmed in the town as the show's fictional setting of Roker Bridge.

== Transport ==
Padiham railway station was on a branch line (known as the Great Harwood loop) of the East Lancashire Line from Burnley to Blackburn. It opened in 1877, but was closed on 2 December 1957 and the station later demolished. The line was retained for deliveries of coal to Padiham Power Station until that closed in 1993. The nearest railway station now is at Hapton, about 2 miles (3.2 km) south. The old line was converted into a footpath/bridleway/cycleway called Padiham Greenway, completed in June 2010.

The town is served by Burnley Bus Company services from Accrington, Burnley, Nelson, Colne and beyond, and by a Blackburn Bus Company service 152 from Burnley, Blackburn and Preston.

Junctions 8 and 10 of the M65 are both some 2 miles (3 km) from the town centre. Junction 8 of the M65 also gives access to the A56 dual carriageway leading to the M66 and access to the Manchester motorway network.

The nearest airport, Manchester, is 50 minutes drive.

== Historic maps ==
The 1845 map (1) shows the town of Padiham in the early days of the Lancashire cotton industry in Victorian times, with three mills marked. Most of the town at that stage was north of the river. The top left-hand corner shows part of the Huntroyde Demesne. The River Calder, on the right of the map, flows to the north, having been diverted in the early 19th century from its original route, away from Gawthorpe Hall (shown in pink), because of pollution. In the 1960s the river was re-routed to its original course to accommodate open-cast coal mining.

The 1890 Ordnance Survey map (2) shows the cotton-industry growth of the cotton industry in the later 19th century. The 1–25,000 scale OS map (3) is a partial extract from the two maps indicated. Several historic locations shown include Read Hall (A2) and Read (B2); Martholme, just east of Martholme Viaduct (A3); Simonstone and Simonstone Hall (C3); Huntroyd and grounds (D1–D2); Padiham Power Station (D3) with the connecting line for fuel; post-war housing north of the town off Slade Lane (E2); High Whitaker (F1); the River Calder on the old course from Gawthore Hall and grounds (F2); Pendle Hall (G1); Ightenhill Manor House (G2); and the Leeds and Liverpool Canal in Burnley (J1). The railway line through Padiham also appears.

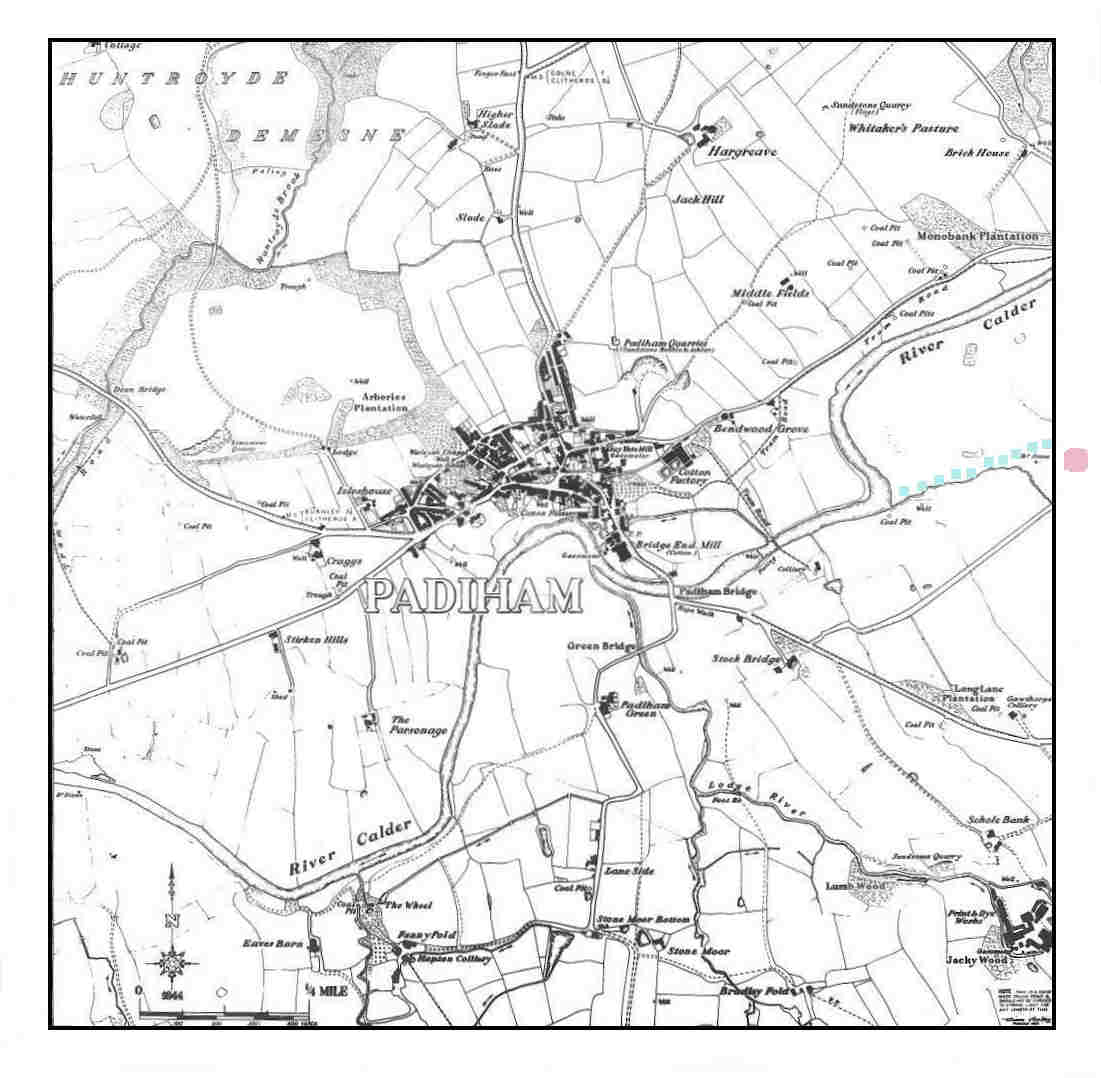
1: Map of Padiham c. 1844

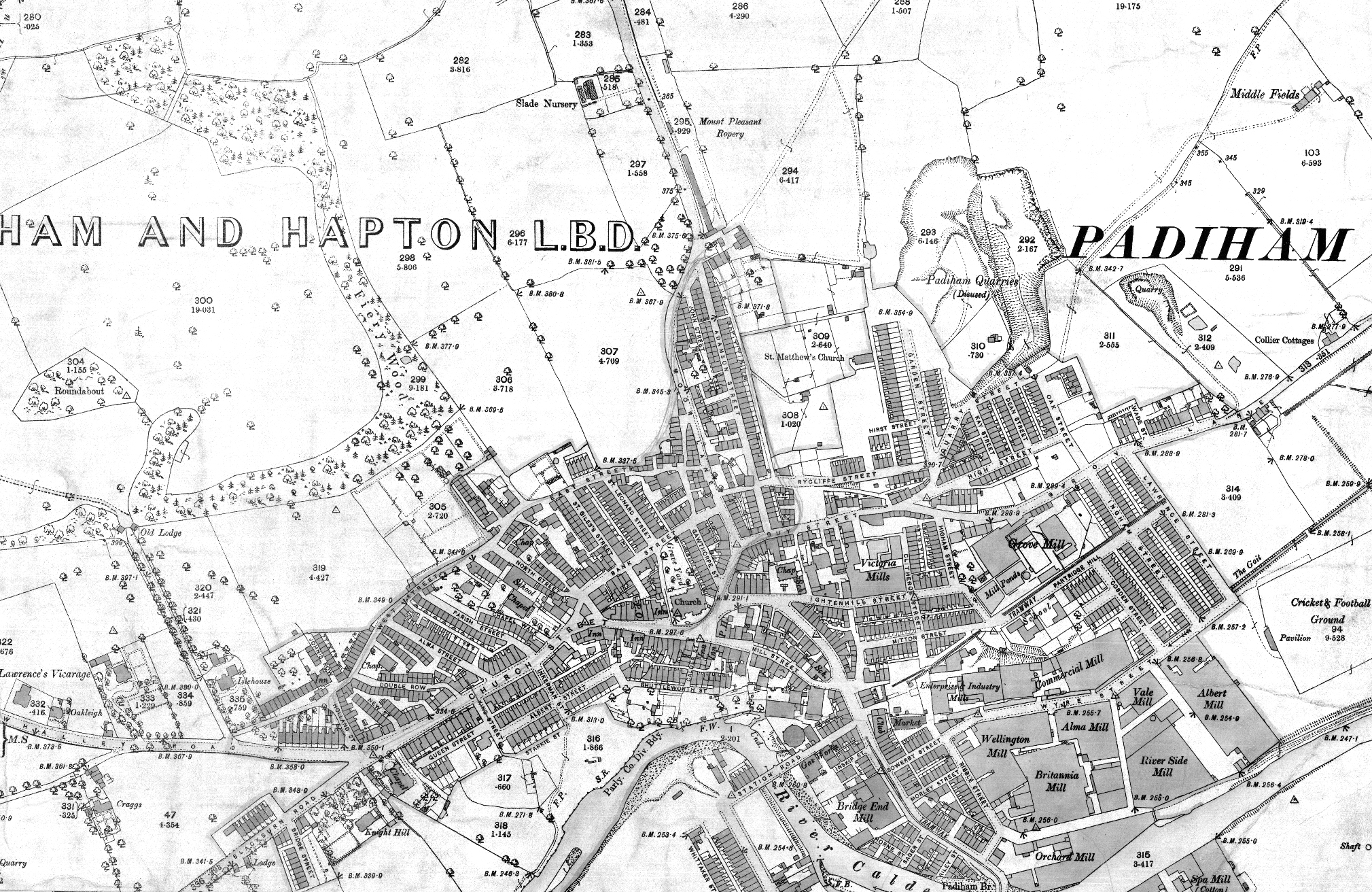
2: Ordnance Survey map dated 1890

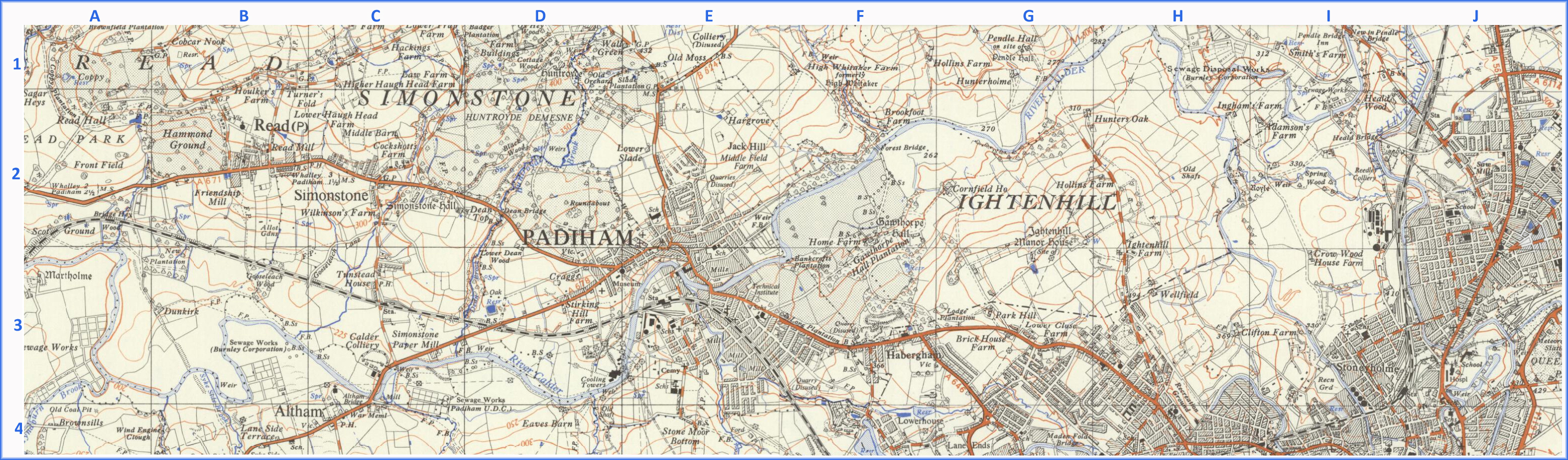
3: Extract from OS 1-25,000 scale maps SD73 (west section pub 1955) and SD83 (east section published 1954) showing historical locations around Padiham. Grid lines are 1 km.

== Notable people ==
- William Blezard (1921–2003), composer born in Padiham, who worked with Joyce Grenfell and others
- Thomas Birtwistle (1833–1912), trade unionist involved in Padiham weavers' strikes in 1859
- Maurice Green (1906–1987), editor of The Financial Times and The Daily Telegraph, born in Padiham
- Cyril Harrison (1901–1980), managing director of English Sewing Cotton Company, educated at Padiham Wesleyan School.
- Sir James Kay-Shuttleworth, 1st Baronet (1804–1877), husband of Janet Kay-Shuttleworth of Gawthorpe Hall, founded teacher training and independent school inspection in England and what is now the University of St Mark & St John
- Ughtred Kay-Shuttleworth, 1st Baron Shuttleworth (1844–1939), Liberal politician, son of Sir James Kay-Shuttleworth. Under-Secretary of State for India and Chancellor of the Duchy of Lancaster under William Gladstone in 1886 and Parliamentary and Financial Secretary to the Admiralty under Gladstone and Lord Rosebery in 1892–1895. He inherited Gawthorpe on his mother's death in 1872.
- Charles Kay-Shuttleworth, 5th Baron Shuttleworth (born 1948), Lord Lieutenant of Lancashire for 1997
- John Starkie (1830–1888), landowner at Ashton Hall, Thurnham, Lancashire
- Le Gendre Starkie (1799–1865) and his son Le Gendre Starkie (1828–1899), landowners at Huntroyde

=== Sport ===
- Bill Blackadder (1899–1977), professional footballer
- Richard Bradshaw (fl. 1900s), footballer born in Padiham, played for Blackpool F.C.
- Harry Hastie (fl. 1920), footballer
- Harry Hill (1916–2009), born in Padiham, a bronze medallist at the 1936 Summer Olympics in Berlin. Too poor to get to London any other way, Hill cycled the 200 miles (320 km) from Sheffield, on the cycle he used in the Olympics.
- William Thompson (1866–1920), cricketer
- Alfred Tysoe (1874–1901), Padiham-born athlete and winner of two gold medals in the 800m and 5,000m team races at the 1900 Olympic Games
- Andy Payton (born 1967), professional footballer, nicknamed the Padiham Predator

== Freedom of the Town ==
The following have received the Freedom of the Town of Padiham.

=== Individuals ===
- Robert "Bob" Clark: 29 June 2021.

== See also ==
- Listed buildings in Padiham
- History of Lancashire
- The Brontë Way
- Lancashire Cotton Corporation
- Lancashire Cotton Famine
- List of mills in Padiham
- Burnley Corporation Tramways
- List of schools in the Borough of Burnley
- Leck Hall (current seat of Baron Shuttleworth, of Gawthorpe Hall)
- Padiham F.C.
