= Cockerham (disambiguation) =

Cockerham is a village in Lancashire, England.

Cockerham may also refer to:

== Buildings ==
- Cockerham Mill, a grist mill in North Carolina, United States
- Cockerham Priory, a priory founded in Cockerham, England in 1207 or 1208
- Cockerham Cross Halt railway station, a railway station founded in Cockerham, England in 1870
- Cockerham Vicarage, a vicarage in Cockerham, England
- St Michael's Church, Cockerham, a church southwest of Cockerham, England

== People ==
- Angela Cockerham, American Democratic Party politician
- Ben Cockerham (born 1980), royalty processing company founder
- C. Clark Cockerham (1921–1996), American geneticist
- Fred Cockerham (1905–1980), American folk musician
- Rob Cockerham, creator of Cockeyed.com

== See also ==
- Listed buildings in Cockerham
- Cockerham bribery case, a case involving United States Army officers accused of accepting bribes
