= The Stork =

Pub in Lancashire, England

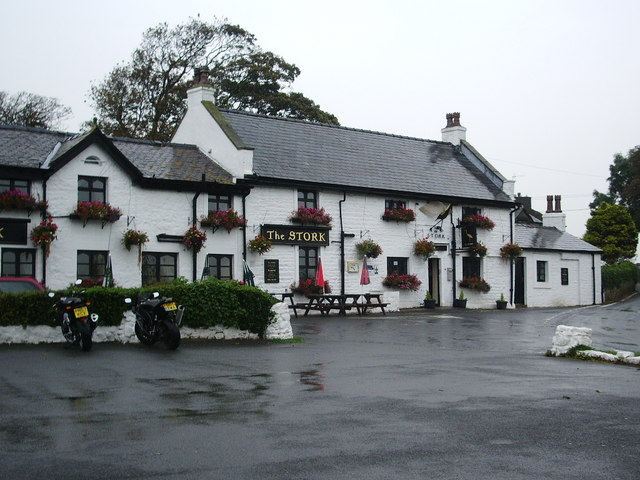
- The building in 2007
- Interactive map of the The Stork area
- Former names: Stork Hotel
- Alternative names: Stork Inn

General information
- Type: Public house and inn
- Location: Corricks Lane, Conder Green, Thurnham, Lancashire, England
- Coordinates: 53.997255°N 2.8257843°W
- Opened: 1660 (366 years ago)
- Renovated: January 2020 to August 2021
- Owner: EI Group

Technical details
- Floor count: 2

Other information
- Number of rooms: 9

Website
- https://www.classicinns.co.uk/stork-hotel-conder-green

The Stork (formerly known as the Stork Hotel) is a public house and inn in the English village of Conder Green, Thurnham, Lancashire. A former coaching inn, the building dates to 1660. It is now a Grade II listed building.

The building stands on the northern side of the curved junction of Corricks Lane and the A588, about 350 feet (110 m) north of the River Conder and about 800 feet (240 m) north of Conder Bridge, another Grade II listed structure.

In January 2020, a fire severely damaged the building. It reopened in August 2021, after twenty months of repairs and renovations.

== Gallery ==
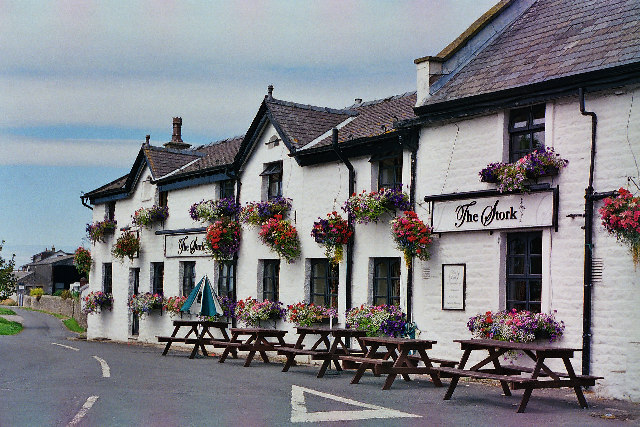
The building's frontage in 2005

== See also ==
- Listed buildings in Thurnham, Lancashire
