= List of private railway stations in Great Britain =

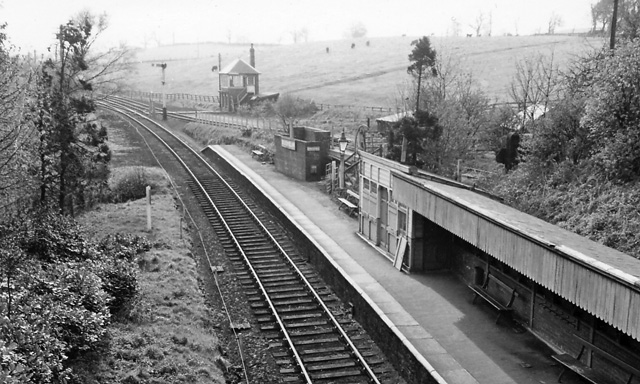
Broomielaw Station (remains) in 1965

This is a list of railway stations which at some time have been private halts. It details the name of the railway station, its location, dates where known, reason for its existence and any additional information that may aid the researcher. The station names in bold are still available for use today.

Name	Location	Dates	Purpose	Notes
Aboyne Curling Pond	Deeside Railway	1891-1925	for curlers	
Alton Park	Basingstoke and Alton Light Railway	1898-1939	To serve Treloar's Hospital.	The film Oh, Mr Porter! was filmed on the line.
Avon Lodge Halt	Between Ringwood and Christchurch	1858-1935	To allow Lord Malmesbury to stop any ordinary train.	An Act of Parliament allowed him to do this.
**Beasdale**	West Highland Line	1901-1965	to serve Arisaig House	Private until 1965 then became public station
Boreham House station	Between Chelmsford and Hatfield Peverel	1843- 1877	A private station for Boreham House.	
Broomielaw station	Barnard Castle branch	1856- 1964	A private halt for the Bowes-Lyon family.	Private until 1942, John Bowes was so proud of Broomielaw station that he named one of his horses after it.
Butterton station	Leek and Manifold Valley Light Railway, Staffordshire	1904-1934	Private Halt for Sir Thomas Wardle.	Wardle built a tunnel through his land to avoid spoiling his view!
**Campbell's Platform railway station**	Ffestiniog railway	1965-	Trains stop when required for visitors to Dduallt Manor	A siding from 1962 to 1966.
Castle Grant Platform	Strathspey, Scotland	1863-1965	For use of the Grant family	by request
Churn	Churn Down, England	1888-1962	For use of firing grounds	One train in one direction a day.
Ashton Hall halt	Glasson Dock branch line, Lancashire	1883-1930	Private Halt for Lord Ashton, local businessman	Served Ashton Hall and the station is still standing
Crathes	Deeside Railway; Crathes Castle, near Banchory, Aberdeenshire	1853-1966	Private Halt for Sir Robert Leys.	In return for leasing the land, even the Royal Train had to stop there.
Crofton	Maryport and Carlisle Railway	1856-1954	For Sir M.H.Brisco of Crofton Hall	Stopped on request
Dovenby Lodge	Maryport and Carlisle Railway	1867- 1935	For Dykes family of Dovenby Hall	
Drummuir Curlers Platform	Keith and Dufftown Railway	?	For curlers	
**Dunrobin Castle**	Duke of Sutherland's Railway. Near Golspie, Sutherland	1870-1965; re-opened 1985	For Duke of Sutherland’s railway.	Advertised in public timetable
Earl Fitzwilliam's private railway station	Elsecar, South Yorkshire	1870-?	Private Halt to transport guests to Wentworth Woodhouse	The trains were known as "E.F.W. specials"
Fallodon railway station	Northumberland	1847-1934	Private station for the Grey family and guests to Fallodon Hall	trains stopped on request
Glencarron Platform	Dingwall and Skye Railway	1873-1887 and 1964-?	Built for local landowner	trains stopped on request
Gorton	West Highland Line	1894-1964	Built at request of local landowner	all trains stopped
Hoe Farm	Hundred of Manhood & Selsey Tramway	1896-1934	To transport farm produce to Chichester.	Provided as part considerations in the conveyance of land for the tramway.
Lanhydrock	Bodmin, Cornwall	1859	Private halt for Henry Agar-Ellis, 3rd Viscount Clifden	Later on a driveway from the Lanhydrock House to Bodmin Parkway railway station was built.
Lemsford Road Halt railway station.	St Albans, Hertfordshire	1942-1951	For workmen at De Havilland's.	Did not appear on public time tables.
Llannerch	Vale of Clwyd Railway	1858-1871	A private station for Whitehall Dod	Director of Vale of Clwyd Railway. Right to stop trains expired in 1871
Lochluichart	Dingwall and Skye Railway	1872-1887	A private platform for Lady Ashburnton on the Lochluichart Lodge estate.	New station opened 1954 when Conon Valley Hydro Electric Scheme raised the height of Loch Luichart.
Londesborough Park railway station	York to Beverley Line	(unknown) - 1867	A short-lived private station for George Hudson of Londesborough Hall.	The station building was renamed Avenue House and remained in-situ until the 1960s.
Longwitton - opened as Rothley	Scotsgap to Rothbury	1870-1952	A private halt for the Trevelyan Estate.	Became a public station in 1875.
Luffness Platform	Aberlady, Gullane and North Berwick Railway; Near Gullane, East Lothian	1903-1932	For members of New Luffness Golf Club Image:Luffness Links.jpg.	Golf club paid a rent to the North British Railway for the privilege.
Medina Wharf Halt railway station.	Isle of Wight	1896-1966	For workmen who unloaded the coal and merchandise.	Did not appear in public time tables.
Ox House	Herefordshire	1857-?	Built for Lord Bateman of Shobdon Court	Private station
Parkhouse Halt	Waverley Line; Near Carlisle	1941-1969	Private halt for Air Force Depot workers	
Philorth Halt	Formartine and Buchan Railway; Near Fraserburgh, Aberdeenshire	1865-1965	Private halt for Lord Saltoun.	The station building has been extended and is now used as a residential building.
**Quainton Road**	Buckinghamshire	since 1971	On special gala days at Buckinghamshire Railway Centre	Not in timetable. Advertised by special notices only
Rosehaugh Halt railway station	Fortrose Branch. Near Avoch, Black Isle	1894-1951	Private Halt for James Douglas Fletcher.	Redcastle Station is the only Black Isle Railway station still standing today.
Seaham Dene	County Durham	1875-1925	To serve the estate of The Marquess of Londonderry.	Described by Pevsner in Buildings of England (Penguin Books, 1957) as "small but decorative".
Watchingwell (Isle of Wight) railway station	Isle of Wight	1897-1953	Private halt for Sir John Barington Simeon, Southampton M.P.	Positioned to serve his Swainston Estate. Sometimes known as Upper Watchingwell Halt
Westmoor Flag	Herefordshire	1863-?		

== See also ==
- Private railway station
- List of private railway stations
