= Conder Green railway station =

Disused station in Lancashire, England

General information
- Location: Thurnham, Lancashire, Lancaster; England
- Coordinates: 53.9982°N 2.8300°W

Other information
- Status: Disused

History
- Original company: London and North Western Railway
- Post-grouping: London Midland and Scottish Railway

Key dates
- 9 July 1883: Station opens as Conder Green
- 7 July 1930: Station closed
Location

Conder Green railway station served the hamlet of Conder Green, in Thurnham, Lancashire, England, with trains to nearby Glasson Dock and Lancaster along the Glasson Dock branch line.

== History ==
Conder was opened by the London and North Western Railway on 9 July 1883. However, the station was passed to the London, Midland and Scottish Railway during the Grouping of 1923, only to be closed seven years later on 7 July 1930.

== The site today ==
The trackbed through the former station is now part of the Lancashire Coastal Way and the larger Bay cycleway. The station itself still stands.

Preceding station	Disused railways	Following station
Ashton Hall	London and North Western Railway; Glasson Dock Branch	Glasson Dock
