= Glasson Dock railway station =

Former railway station in Scotland

General information
- Location: Thurnham, Lancashire, Lancaster; England
- Coordinates: 53.9968°N 2.8411°W
- Platforms: 1

Other information
- Status: Disused

History
- Original company: London & North Western Railway
- Post-grouping: London, Midland & Scottish Railway

Key dates
- 9 July 1883: Station opens as Glasson Dock
- 7 July 1930: Station closed
Location

Glasson Dock railway station served the town of Glasson Dock, in Thurnham, Lancashire, England, with trains to nearby Conder Green and Lancaster along the Glasson Dock branch line.

== History ==
Glasson Dock was opened by the London & North Western Railway on 9 July 1883. The station passed to the London, Midland & Scottish Railway during the Grouping of 1923, only to be closed seven years later on 7 July 1930.

== The site today ==
The trackbed through the former station is now part of the Lancashire Coastal Way and the longer Bay Cycle Way. However, the station itself was demolished after goods services stopped in 1964.

== Sources ==
- Atterbury, Paul (2008). Tickets Please. David & Charles. ISBN 978-0-7153-2876-7.
- Quick, Michael (2022) [2001]. Railway passenger stations in Great Britain: a chronology (PDF). version 5.04. Railway & Canal Historical Society. Archived from the original (PDF) on 25 November 2022.

Preceding station	Disused railways	Following station
Conder Green	London & North Western Railway; Glasson Dock Branch	terminus
