= St Thomas & St Elizabeth Church =

Coordinates: 53.98201°N 2.81632°W

- Thurnham Church
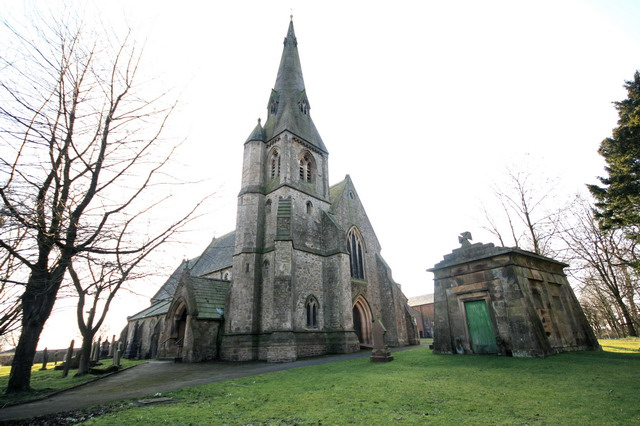
- St Thomas & St Elizabeth Church
- OS grid reference: SD 46568 54295
- Location: Lodge Cottages, Thurnham, Lancashire
- Country: England
- Denomination: Roman Catholic
- Website: thurnhamchurch.net

History
- Dedication: Thomas the Apostle & Elizabeth of Hungary

Architecture
- Heritage designation: Grade II
- Architect: C. Hansom
- Style: Gothic Revival

Administration
- Province: Liverpool
- Diocese: Lancaster
- Parish: The Cathedral Parish of St Peter & the Lancaster Martyrs

Clergy
- Bishop: Paul Swarbrick
- Priest: Fr. David Branford

St Thomas and St. Elizabeth Church, also known simply as Thurnham Church, is a Roman Catholic Church in Thurnham, Lancashire, England. The parish was established in 1785, with Fr. James Foster serving as the first parish priest. Prior to this, the district was served by travelling priests, often staying with the Dalton family at Thurnham Hall. One such priest, Rev. James Swarbrick, was known as "The Riding Priest". He was arrested in 1715 and died in Lancaster Castle in 1716, possibly due to torture. A small chalice he carried on his travels remains preserved.

== History ==
Before the church’s establishment, local Catholics were ministered to by travelling priests, often hosted at Thurnham Hall. One such figure, Rev. James Swarbrick, known as "The Riding Priest", was arrested in 1715 and later died in Lancaster Castle in 1716, possibly as a result of torture.

The Catholic mission in Thurnham was formally established in 1785 when Fr. James Foster was appointed as the first resident priest. Funding came from Miss Jane Daniel of Euxton, who left a £1,000 bequest in 1780 to support a priest in the district. The Dalton family donated seven acres of land for the church and presbytery, enabling Fr. Foster to establish a permanent parish.

Fr. Foster spent 16 years gathering funds to build a chapel. Notable contributions included £50 each from John Dalton, Robert Gillow, and Richard Worswick, in return for exemption from pew rents. The chapel was blessed and opened in 1818, costing £1,600. Fr. Foster served for 38 years until his death in 1824 and was buried outside the chapel. His grave now lies beneath the present church.

Fr. Foster’s successor, Fr. Thomas Crowe, oversaw plans for a new church. Financial support came from Miss Elizabeth Dalton, who covered most of the costs. The foundation stone was laid on March 18, 1847, and the church was consecrated on August 29, 1848. Three bishops—Bishop Browne, Bishop Briggs, and Bishop Sharples—were present at the dedication, which included a grand procession from Thurnham Hall. The final cost of the church, including furnishings, was £5,000.

== Architecture ==
The church was designed by architect Charles Hansom known for designing several northern churches, and built by George Taylor of Coventry. The stone was sourced from Dalton's quarry near Lancaster.

=== Bells ===
The five church bells were cast by John Taylor of Loughborough, one of his earliest independent works. Each bell bears a Latin inscription, including "O Pure, Holy Virgin Mary, protect those whom I call" and "Hail Mary, full of grace". The bells were originally rung automatically via a mechanism made by Meyer of Bristol, which has since deteriorated. The bell structure is now unsafe due to a rotted support beam.

=== Interior and Furnishings ===
The rood screen, a significant feature, divides the altar from the main church. The stained glass windows were crafted by Walles of Newcastle-on-Tyne, based on designs by the architect. The Last Judgement painting above the rood screen was created by H. Doyle of London, the first of its kind in a Catholic church since the Reformation. Several notable items were donated:

- Miss Dalton commissioned a large ciborium through Cardinal Wiseman for £50.
- Miss Gillow donated a monstrance designed by A.W. Pugin, costing £70.
- T.F. Brockholes contributed an enamelled chalice.
- Statues of Saint Thomas the Apostle and Saint Elizabeth of Hungary at the high altar commemorate Fr. Crowe and Miss Dalton.

=== Dalton Family Mausoleum ===
A mausoleum for the Gillow family, styled in Egyptian architecture, stands outside the main door. The family later moved to Leighton Hall, Lancashire, where another crypt was built at Yealand Church.

== Gallery ==
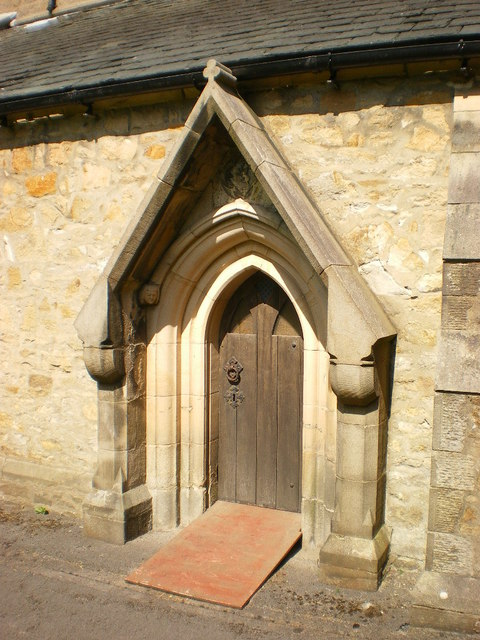
West door

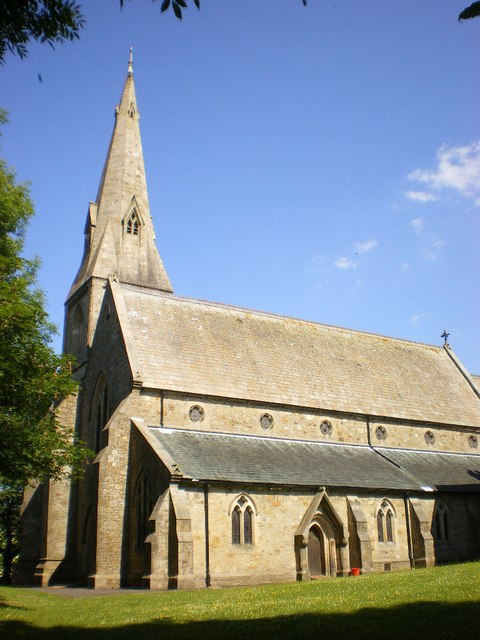
Church seen from the west

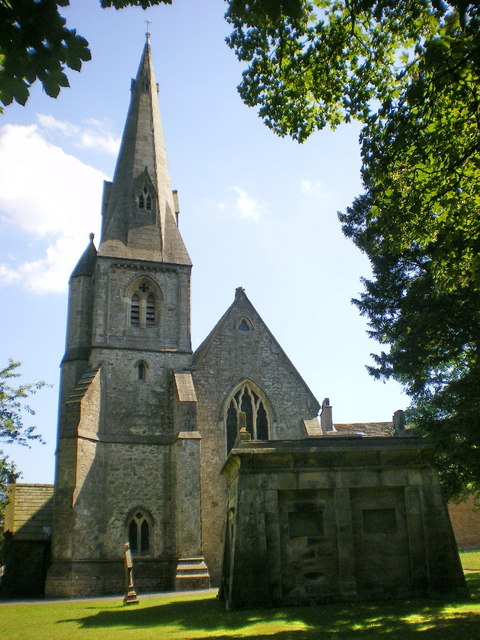
Church, seen from the north

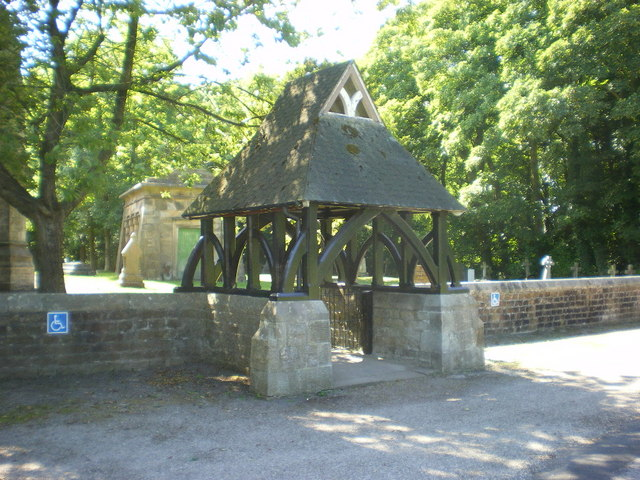
Lych Gate

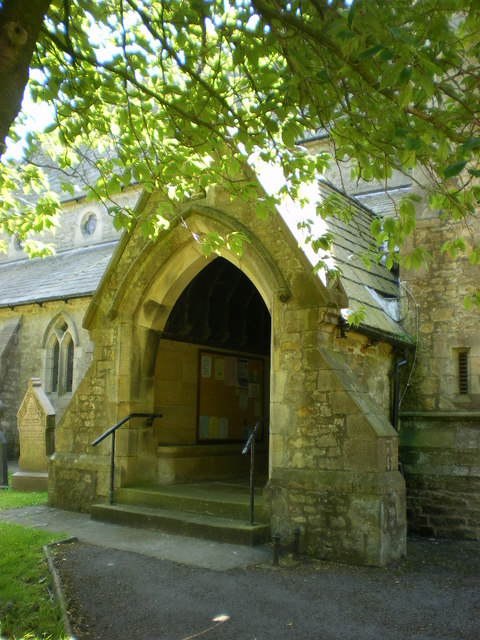
The Porch

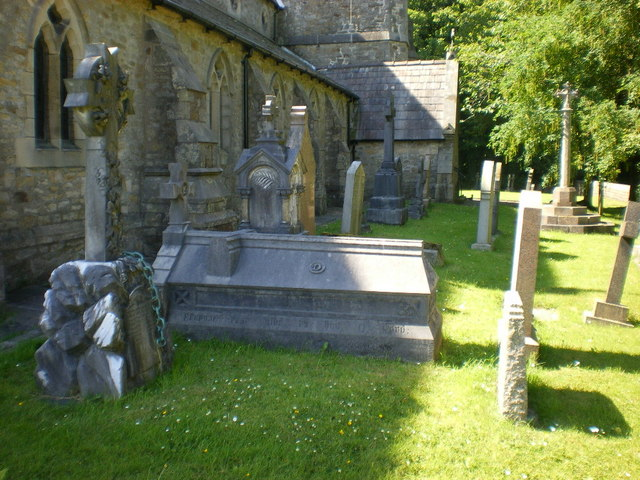
The Graveyard
