= Cockersand Abbey =

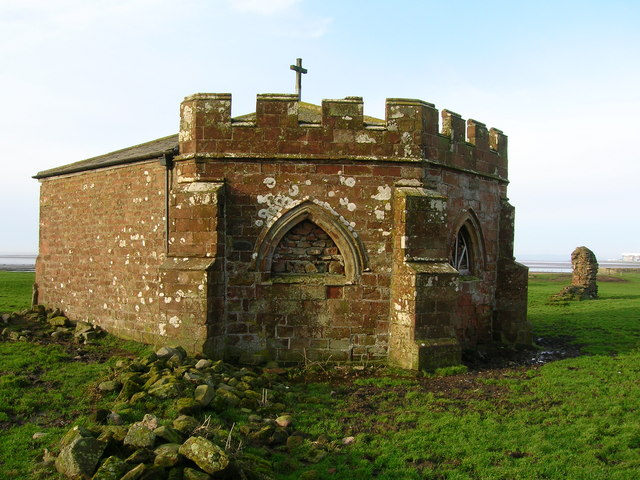
- Cockersand Abbey chapter house

- Location in the City of Lancaster district Location on Morecambe Bay Location in Lancashire
- 53.977°N 2.875°W
- Location: Thurnham, Lancashire

Scheduled monument
- Official name: Cockersand Premonstratensian Abbey
- Designated: 13 January 1915
- Reference no.: 1018919

Listed Building – Grade I
- Official name: The Chapter House, Cockersand Abbey
- Designated: 2 May 1968
- Reference no.: 1362525

Cockersand Abbey is a former abbey and former civil parish near Cockerham in the City of Lancaster district of Lancashire, England. It is situated near the mouth of the River Cocker.

== History ==
It was founded before 1184 as the Hospital of St Mary on the marsh belonging to Leicester Abbey. It was refounded by the Cambro-Norman magnate, Theobald Walter, 1st Baron Butler, as a Premonstratensian priory in 1190. It was subsequently elevated to an abbey in 1192. It also continued as a hospital. The Abbey was originally located in marsh land which was later drained, becoming known as St. Mary's of the Marsh.

The abbey was the third richest in Lancashire when it was dissolved in 1539 and acquired by a John Kechyn in 1544. The site is now adjacent to a farm house and the only significant relic is the still intact, vaulted Cockersand Abbey chapter house, which was built in 1230 and used as a family mausoleum by the Daltons of Thurnham Hall during the 18th and 19th centuries. The land was acquired by the Daltons shortly after 1556, when Sir Robert Dalton married Ann Kitchen There are some scrappy remains of the church adjacent. A tradition that the medieval choir stalls in the nearby Lancaster Priory originated from here has been discredited.

The chapter house is a Grade I listed building and scheduled ancient monument. In 2007 English Heritage made an £80,000 grant to the owner to help preserve the building. The chapter house is open to the public on special occasions such as Heritage Open Days.

== Roman statuettes ==
Two Roman statuettes were discovered on Cockersand Moss near the abbey site in 1718, possibly indicating the presence of a Romano-British shrine nearby. One statuette of Mars, which was part of Lord Arundel's collection that William Stukeley exhibited in 1719 to the Society of Antiquaries, had an inscription which has been recorded as DEO MARTI NODONTI AVRELIVS ..... CINVS SIG (Deo Marti Nodonti Aurelius ..... cinus sig(illum)). The second, smaller and inferior quality, statuette was reported as containing the inscription LVCIANVS D.M.N. COL LIC APRILI VIATORIS V S (D(eo)M(arti) N(odonti) LucianusI collic(io) Aprili Viato ris v(otum) s(olvit)).

== List of dignitaries ==
- Hugh (Garth) the Hermit ‘Master of the Hospital’ (before 1184)
- Henry (?–1190)
- Thomas 'Abbas de Marisco' (1194–1199)
- Roger 'Abbas de Marisco', 'abbas de Kokersand' (1205–6)
- Hereward (fl. 1216–1235)
- Richard de Freckleton (fl. 1240)
- Henry (fl. 1246–1261)
- Adam de Blake (fl. 1269–1278)
- Thomas (fl. 1286–1288)
- Robert of Formby (fl. 1289–1290)
- Roger (fl. 1300)
- Thomas (fl. 1305–1307)
- Roger (fl. 1311–1331)
- William of Boston (fl. 1334–1340)
- Robert of Carleton (fl. 1347–1354)
- Jordan of Bosedon (fl. 1354–1364)
- Richard (fl. 1382)
- Thomas (fl. 1386–1389)
- William Stamford (fl. 1393)
- Thomas of Burgh (fl. 1395–1403)
- Thomas Green (1410–1444?)
- Robert Egremont (1444–c. 1474)
- William Lucas (–1477)
- William Bowland (1477–1490)
- John Preston (1490–1502?)
- James Skipton (1502–1505)
- Henry Stayning (1505–1509)
- John Croune (1509–?)
- George Billington (fl. 1520–1522)
- John Bowland (fl. 1524–1527)
- surnamed Newsham (?)
- Gilbert Ainsworth (1531)
- Robert Kendal (1531–1533)
- Robert Poulton (1533–1538/9)

== Civil parish ==
The civil parish of Cockersand Abbey was created as a local government unit in 1858, and was part of Lancaster Rural District from 1894. It was abolished and incorporated into Thurnham civil parish in 1935. The population was recorded as 26 in 1871, 53 in 1901, and 25 in 1931 The parish included the area around the abbey and extended north and south along the coast.

== Media gallery ==
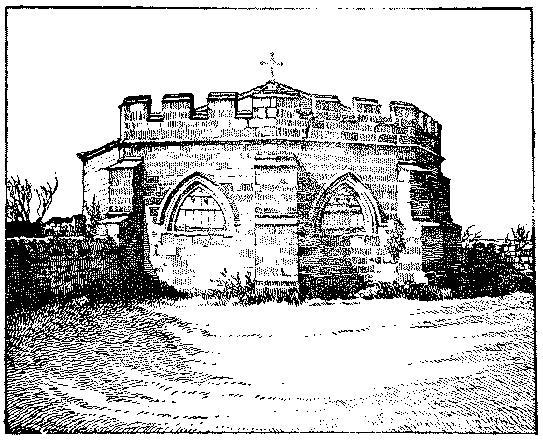
Engraving of the chapter house at Cockersand Abbey

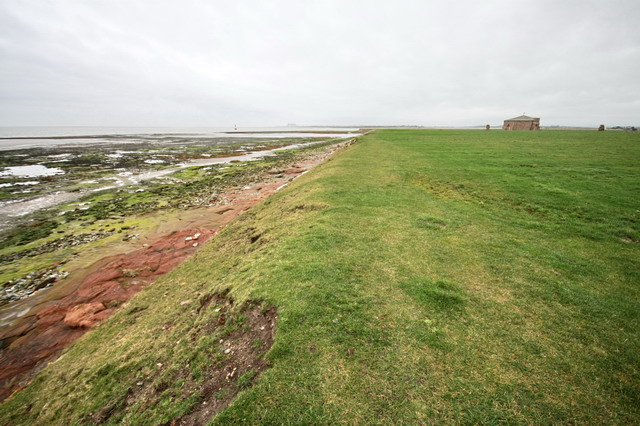
The Lancashire Coastal Way passes the site of the abbey

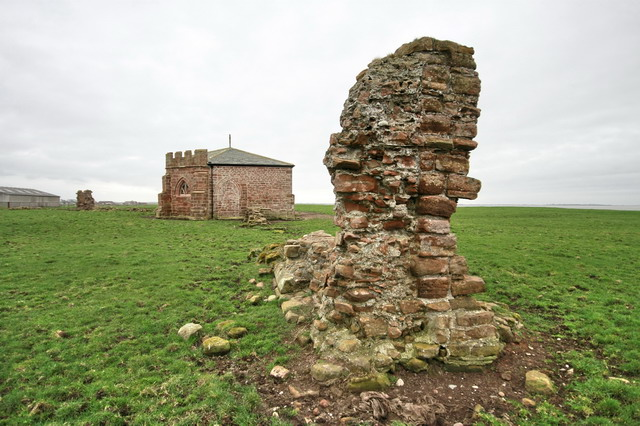
Surviving fragment of a wall

== See also ==
- Grade I listed buildings in Lancashire
- Scheduled monuments in Lancashire
- Listed buildings in Thurnham, Lancashire
- List of monastic houses in Lancashire
- Abbeys and priories in England
- Mains Hall
