= Cockersand Abbey chapter house =

Listed building in Lancashire, England

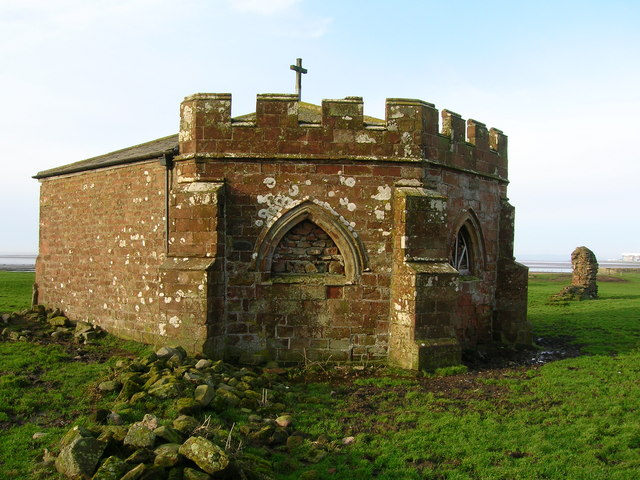
- The building in 2008

- Location within Lancashire

General information
- Type: Mausoleum
- Location: Thurnham, Lancashire, England
- Coordinates: 54.008924°N 2.822907°W
- Opened: 1230 (796 years ago)

Technical details
- Material: Red sandstone

Listed Building – Grade I
- Designated: 2 May 1968
- Reference no.: 1362525

Cockersand Abbey chapter house is a mausoleum in the English village of Thurnham, Lancashire. A Grade I listed building and formerly part of Cockersand Abbey, it dates to 1230. It was used as a family mausoleum by the Daltons of Thurnham Hall during the 18th and 19th centuries. The land was acquired by the Daltons shortly after 1556, when Sir Robert Dalton married Ann Kitchen.

Cockersand Abbey has existed from the late 12th century. The building is constructed of red sandstone rubble and has a slate roof. Its plan is octagonal although the west side has been squared off. At some point (probably the mid-18th century) it was converted into a family burial chamber.

== See also ==
- Listed buildings in Thurnham, Lancashire
