= Cockerham Priory =

Augustinian priory in Lancashire, England

- Location within the City of Lancaster district
- Interactive map of Cockerham Priory

Monastery information
- Established: 1207 or 1208
- Disestablished: 1477

Architecture
- Status: Priory
- Functional status: Demolished

Site
- Location: Cockerham, Lancashire, England
- Coordinates: 53.9601°N 2.8204°W
- Grid reference: SD 4626 5185
- Visible remains: None

Cockerham Priory was a priory served by Austin Canons in Cockerham, Lancashire, England. St Michael's Church was granted to Leicester Abbey c. 1153–54, with some land. The priory was founded in 1207 or 1208 as a cell of the Abbey of St Mary de Pratis ("St Mary in the Meadows") in Leicester.
