= Listed buildings in Cockerham =

Cockerham is a civil parish in Lancaster, Lancashire, England. It contains 19 listed buildings that are recorded in the National Heritage List for England. Of these, two are listed at Grade II*, the middle grade, and the others are at Grade II. Apart from the village of Cockerham, the parish is rural, and most of the listed buildings are houses, cottages, farmhouses and farm buildings. The other listed buildings include a church, the base of a sundial, boundary stones, and a bridge.

== Key ==
Grade	Criteria
II*	Particularly important buildings of more than special interest
II	Buildings of national importance and special interest

== Buildings ==
Name and location	Photograph	Date	Notes	Grade
St Michael's Church; 53.96011°N 2.82063°W		16th century	The oldest part of the church is the tower, which is Perpendicular in type. The rest of the church was rebuilt in 1814, and again in 1910–11 by Austin and Paley. It is built in sandstone with a slate roof, and consists of a nave and chancel with a clerestory, aisles, a south transept with a vestry, and a west tower. The tower has buttresses, a stair turret, and an embattled parapet.	II*
Ware Cottage; 53.96830°N 2.82211°W	—	c. 1600	The house, originally timber-framed, is in sandstone and cobble, with a corrugated iron roof replacing thatch. Some of the windows have retained their mullions. Inside there are at least two cruck trusses, and timber-framing with wattle and daub infill.	II
Cockerham Hall; 53.96334°N 2.82069°W	—	Early 17th century (probable)	A large sandstone house with a slate roof that was altered in the 19th century, and contains medieval timber-framing. It consists of a main block and a cross-wing, and has two storeys with attics. The windows are mullioned.	II
Shepherd's Farmhouse; 53.95666°N 2.83397°W	—	1705	A house in painted brick on a plinth with sandstone dressings and a slate roof. It has a T-shaped plan, two storeys with attics, and a six-bay front. The windows are mullioned. The doorway has an architrave with an inscribed frieze, and a cornice.	II*
Barn, Shepherd's Farm; 53.95672°N 2.83365°W	—	1708	The barn is in brick with sandstone dressings and has a corrugated asbestos roof. It contains a wide entrance, ventilation slits, an inscribed plaque, and doorways, windows and pitching holes, some of which are blocked. On the west wall are sandstone troughs.	II
Barn, Norbrick Farm; 53.97416°N 2.83705°W	—	1718	The barn is in sandstone and cobble and has a stone-slate roof. On the west wall is a wide entrance that has a segmental arch with a keystone and a canopy), and to its right is a projecting extension. Elsewhere there are ventilation slits, pitching holes, windows and doorways.	II
Marsh House Farmhouse, store and barn 53.95620°N 2.82904°W	—	Early 18th century	The farmhouse and attached buildings are in stone. The house has a slate roof, with two storeys and three bays. The windows are mullioned, and the doorway has a stone surround with long-and-short jambs. The barn and store have a corrugated sheet roof, and contain entrances, a doorway, a ventilation slit, and pitch holes.	II
Sundial base 53.95975°N 2.82071°W	—	18th century	The sundial base is in the churchyard of St Michael's Church to the south of the church. It is in sandstone, and consists of a fluted Doric column with a moulded capital. The column is flattened towards the top and sits on a semicircular step.	II
Boundary stone 53.91783°N 2.86401°W	—	Late 18th century	The stone is in gritstone and incorporates earlier material. It consists of a square shaft about 1.25 metres (4 ft 1 in) high in a socket carved crudely with a cross. The cross marks the boundaries of Cockerham, Pilling and Winmarleigh parishes, and also the former hundreds of Lonsdale and Amounderness.	II
Crookhey Farmhouse; 53.94971°N 2.80710°W	—	Late 18th century	The farmhouse is in pebbledashed stone with sandstone dressings, and it has a slate roof. There are two storeys and five bays with chamfered quoins. The windows are sashes, and the central doorway has a shouldered architrave and a moulded pediment.	II
Crookall Bridge; 53.94935°N 2.80601°W	—	Early 19th century (probable)	The bridge carries Garstang Road (B5272) over the River Cocker. It is in sandstone and consists of a single segmental arch with chamfered voussoirs and a solid parapet. There is an inscription on the east parapet, and at the ends of the bridge are piers.	II
Laund House; 53.97790°N 2.82124°W	—	Early 19th century	A rendered house with a slate roof in two storeys and three bays. It has a cornice and a central pediment. The windows are modern, and in front of the door is a porch with fluted antae. Flanking the house are walls with Venetian openings each containing a door and windows.	II
Old Rectory; 53.96420°N 2.81798°W	—	1843	Originally a vicarage designed by Edmund Sharpe, later a nursing home, and then converted into flats. It is built in sandstone with a slate roof, and has two storeys and attics. It has a symmetrical front, the outer bays being gabled. The central bay contains a doorway with a Tudor arched head, and above it is a datestone. At the top of this bay is a shield carved an open Bible and a motto. The windows are mullioned and transomed.	II
1, 2 and 3 Crimbles Cottages; 53.94689°N 2.83011°W	—	19th century	A row of three cottages in stone and brick with a slate roof, and containing some material remaining from the 17th century. They are in two storeys, and each house has two bays. The doors have a plain stone surround, and most of the windows have retained their mullions.	II
Boundary stone 53.96030°N 2.80675°W	—	Mid-19th century	The boundary stone is adjacent to the north parapet of Cocker House Bridge, and it marks the boundary of the parish with that of Forton. It is in sandstone, with a semi-octagon plan, and an ogee top. The left side is inscribed "LONSDALE SOUTH", and the other" AMOUNDERNESS".	II
Boundary stone 53.97061°N 2.86810°W	—	19th century	The boundary stone is also known as Askell's cross, and it marks the boundary of the parish with that of Thurnham. It is in sandstone and has a rectangular plan. The west face is inscribed with "T" and the east face with "C".	II
Crookhey Hall; 53.95404°N 2.80873°W	—	1874	A country house by Alfred Waterhouse. It is in sandstone with slate roofs, and has two storeys with attics. The main front is asymmetrical, with a porte-cochère behind which is a slim four-stage tower. To the left of this are three bays with attic dormers, a gabled cross-wing, and another gabled bay with a jettied upper floor. On the left side is a circular turret with a conical roof. The windows are mullioned or mullioned and transomed.	II
Lodge, Crookhey Hall; 53.95531°N 2.81128°W	—	1877	Probably designed by Alfred Waterhouse, the lodge has two storeys, it is in sandstone, and has slate roofs and pierced ridge tiles. The doorway has a moulded surround, a hood, and a shaped lintel with the date. On the side facing the drive is a two-storey canted bay window with a hipped roof. The chimneys have four octagonal shafts.	II
Boundary stone 53.97184°N 2.86746°W	—	Uncertain	The boundary stone is to the north of Lower Bank House Farmhouse, and it marks the boundary of the parish with that of Thurnham. It is in sandstone, but much eroded, and is roughly in the shape of a cross.	II
