= River Cocker =

River Cocker may refer to:

- River Cocker, Cumbria, a river in the English county of Cumbria
- River Cocker, Lancashire, a river in the English county of Lancashire
