= Listed buildings in Thurnham, Lancashire =

Thurnham is a civil parish in Lancaster, Lancashire, England. It contains 37 listed buildings that are recorded in the National Heritage List for England. Of these, three are listed at Grade I, the highest of the three grades, three are at Grade II*, the middle grade, and the others are at Grade II, the lowest grade.

The parish contains the villages of Upper Thurnham, Lower Thurnham, and Conder Green, and also Glasson Dock and the surrounding settlement. The Lancaster Canal and its branch to Glasson Dock pass through the parish and associated with these are listed bridges and locks. Also passing through the parish is the River Conder, and a bridge crossing this is listed. There are two country houses; these are listed together with structures associated with them. Most of the parish is rural, and there are some listed farmhouses. The other listed buildings include the chapter house of the former Cockersand Abbey, two public houses, two churches and associated structures, a milestone, two boundary stones, and two dock buildings.

== Key ==
Grade	Criteria
I	Buildings of exceptional interest, sometimes considered to be internationally important
II*	Particularly important buildings of more than special interest
II	Buildings of national importance and special interest

== Buildings ==
Name and location	Photograph	Date	Notes	Grade
Chapter House, Cockersand Abbey; 53.97676°N 2.87511°W		1230	The chapter house was later converted into a burial chamber. It is in sandstone with a slate roof. The building has an octagonal plan, with the west end squared off. There is an embattled parapet, a buttress with offsets on each angle, and a blocked window with a pointed arch on each side. Inside is a central pier and the walls are arcaded and contain memorials to the Dalton family. The building and the surrounding area is a Scheduled Monument.	I
Ashton Hall; 54.00899°N 2.82279°W		14th century	A mansion that was largely rebuilt in 1856, and later used as a golf club house. It is in sandstone with slate roofs. The older part consists of a medieval tower in red sandstone with diagonally-set angle towers and an embattled parapet. The newer part is in grey sandstone, it is in Gothic style, and its features include battlements, tall chimneys, towers and turrets.	I
Courtyard wall (west), Ashton Hall; 54.00890°N 2.82329°W	—	c. 1600	The wall connects the hall to the gatehouse. It is in sandstone, and has a stepped triangular coping. It incorporates a blocked doorway with a moulded surround and a segmental arch.	II
Courtyard wall (south and west), Ashton Hall; 54.00862°N 2.82291°W	—	c. 1600	The wall connects the hall to the gatehouse. It is in sandstone, and has a stepped triangular coping. It incorporates a moulded doorway with a segmental arch.	II
Gatehouse, Ashton Hall; 54.00880°N 2.82337°W	—	c. 1600	The gatehouse is in sandstone and consists of a single segmental arch. On the west side are two Doric columns with an entablature and three square finials. To the left is living accommodation added in the 19th century in two storeys.	II*
Thurnham Hall; 53.98422°N 2.81967°W		c. 1600	A country house in sandstone with a slate roof, and in three storeys. The west front by Robert Roper dates from 1823, and is symmetrical in Gothic style. It contains an embattled parapet, a central projection, and octagonal corner turrets. Some of the windows are mullioned and transoms with Tudor arched heads, and others are sashes. Behind the main range are further ranges, one of which contains Venetian windows. Inside a rear wing is timber-framed partitioning.	I
Former stable block, Ashton Hall; 54.00904°N 2.82382°W	—	17th century	The former stables, later converted into a house, are in sandstone with a stone-slate roof. The house has two storeys and five bays. The windows are mullioned, and the doorway has long-and-short jambs, a plain lintel, and a hood. At the rear is a first-floor doorway with a Tudor arched head, later converted into a window.	II*
Crook Farmhouse; 53.98854°N 2.86930°W	—	Late 17th century	A pebbledashed stone house with a slate roof in two storeys. On the main front are the re-set heads of two Perpendicular windows; elsewhere most of the windows are modern. Inside the house is a bressumer.	II
Stork Hotel; 53.99723°N 2.82587°W		Late 17th century	A public house in stone with two storeys and three bays. The upper floor windows are mullioned, and the doorway has a moulded surround and a battlemented lintel.	II
Dower House, Thurnham Hall; 53.98440°N 2.81922°W	—	Late 17th century	The house, later altered, is in brick with a sandstone plinth and dressings, and a slate roof. There are two storeys, and the windows are sashes plus one Venetian window containing Gothick tracery. The doorway has a glazed porch and a moulded surround.	II
Barn, Crook Farm; 53.98882°N 2.86929°W	—	1676	The barn is in sandstone and cobble with a slate roof.. It has seven bays, and incorporates re-used dressings from Cockersand Abbey. The openings include doorways, windows, a wide entrance, and ventilation slits.	II
Clarkson's Farmhouse; 53.98382°N 2.85820°W	—	1680	The farmhouse is in sandstone with a slate roof, and has two storeys and three bays. There is one mullioned window, the others being sashes or modern. On the front is a gabled porch, and the inner doorway has a chamfered surround and an inscribed shaped lintel, Inside the house is a bressumer.	II
Websters Farmhouse; 53.99546°N 2.82220°W	—	1681	A stone house with a slate roof, in two storeys and two bays. The windows, some of which are modern, are mullioned. The doorway has a chamfered surround and an inscribed shaped lintel.	II
Bank House Farmhouse; 53.97068°N 2.86923°W	—	1690	The farmhouse is in pebbledashed sandstone and has a steep slate roof. There are two storeys and three bays. The windows and doors have plain surrounds and inside the house is a bressumer.	II
Mounting block, Ashton Hall; 54.00881°N 2.82336°W	—	18th century (probable)	The mounting block is in sandstone. There are six steps on the north side.	II
Custom House; 53.99985°N 2.85033°W	—	Late 18th century	The former custom house on Glasson Dock is in sandstone with a slate roof and is in two storeys. It has sash windows and a wide doorway with a stone lintel.	II
Brantbeck Bridge; 54.00981°N 2.80605°W		Late 18th century	The bridge carries Tarnwater Lane over the Lancaster Canal. It is in sandstone and is a tall bridge with a concave plan and a single elliptical arch. The bridge has an impost band, a triple keystone, and a solid parapet with rounded coping.	II
Lighthouse; 53.99971°N 2.84871°W		Late 18th century	The building on Glasson Dock is in sandstone with a slate roof and is in one storey. On the south gable is a square chimney broaching to an octagon, and on the south gable is an octagonal lantern with a metal roof.	II
New Park Bridge (No. 89); 54.00167°N 2.80261°W		1797	An accommodation bridge over the Lancaster Canal in sandstone. It consists of a single elliptical arch with a stepped keystone, and has a solid parapet with rounded coping.	II
Ashton Park Bridge (No. 90); 54.00544°N 2.80753°W		1797	An accommodation bridge over the Lancaster Canal in sandstone. It consists of a single elliptical arch with a stepped keystone, and has a solid parapet with rounded coping.	II
Burrow Beck Bridge (No.92); 54.01457°N 2.80659°W		1797	An accommodation bridge over the Lancaster Canal in sandstone. It consists of a single elliptical arch with a stepped keystone, and has a solid parapet with rounded coping.	II
Carr Lane Bridge (No. 93); 54.02032°N 2.80837°W		1797	The bridge carries Carr Lane over the Lancaster Canal. It is in sandstone with a concave plan, and consists of a single semi-elliptical arch with a triple keystone. The centres of the solid parapets have been replaced by railings.	II
Victoria Hotel; 53.99837°N 2.84696°W		c. 1800	A public house in rendered stone with a slate roof, it has three storeys and a symmetrical front of three bays. In the outer bays are two-storey canted bay windows. The windows in the lower two floors are sashes, and the central doorway has a plain surround.	II
Third Lock; 53.98154°N 2.80381°W		1823–25	The lock is on the Glasson Branch of the Lancaster Canal. It is in sandstone and has two pairs of timber gates.	II
Fourth Lock; 53.98500°N 2.81421°W		1823–25	The lock is on the Glasson Branch of the Lancaster Canal. It is in sandstone and has two pairs of timber gates.	II
Fifth Lock; 53.99005°N 2.81974°W		1823–25	The lock is on the Glasson Branch of the Lancaster Canal. It is in sandstone and has two pairs of timber gates.	II
Sixth Lock; 53.99192°N 2.82373°W		1823–25	The lock is on the Glasson Branch of the Lancaster Canal. It is in sandstone and has two pairs of timber gates.	II
Boundary stone 54.00947°N 2.79393°W	—	Early 19th century (probable)	The boundary stone is in sandstone and has a triangular plan. The left face is inscribed with "Ashton with Stodday", and the right face with "Scotforth".	II
Conder Bridge; 53.99489°N 2.82574°W		Early 19th century (probable)	The bridge carries the A588 road over the River Conder. It consists of a single segmental arch, with terminal piers. There are further piers at the ends of the abutments, and the bridge has a solid parapet.	II
Milestone; 54.00752°N 2.79334°W	—	Early 19th century (probable)	The milestone is in sandstone with cast iron plates. It has a triangular section, and the plates are inscribed with the distances in miles to Lancaster and to Garstang.	II
Gillow Mausoleum; 53.98218°N 2.81647°W		c. 1830	The mausoleum is in the churchyard of the Church of St. Thomas and St. Elizabeth. It is in sandstone, in Egyptian style, and has a rectangular plan. There are buttresses on the corners, and a coved moulded cornice. On the sides are doorways with architraves, and on the south front are four recessed Egyptian columns with bud bases, reeded bands, fluting, and bell capitals with papyrus decoration.	II*
Christ Church; 53.99649°N 2.84268°W		1839–40	The church was designed by Edmund Sharpe, and the chancel and vestry were added in 1931–32 by Henry Paley. It is in sandstone with a slate roof, and consists of a nave and a chancel with vestry at a lower level. The windows are lancets, and on the west gable is a bellcote. Inside there is a west gallery.	II
Church of St. Thomas and St. Elizabeth; 53.98201°N 2.81632°W		1847–48	A Catholic church by Charles Hansom in sandstone with a slate roof. It consists of a nave with a clerestory, aisles, a north porch, a chancel, and a northwest tower. The tower is in three stages with a semi-octagonal stair turret and a broach spire with two tiers of lucarnes.	II
Cross; 53.98212°N 2.81614°W		19th century (probable)	The cross is in the churchyard of St Thomas and St Elizabeth. It is in limestone on a sandstone base. The cross stands on three octagonal steps and has an octagonal pedestal and shaft, On this is a moulded cap and a foliated cross head.	II
Ice house, Ashton Hall; 54.01028°N 2.82639°W	—	19th century (probable)	The ice house is in sandstone and brick. It is covered by earth and vegetation, and consists of a domed area with a vaulted entrance.	II
Chapel, Thurnham Hall; 53.98403°N 2.81971°W	—	1854–55	The chapel, attached to the south of the hall, was a Catholic private chapel. It is in sandstone with a slate roof. It has two embattled turrets, and an embattled parapet. The west end is gabled, with a three-light window. On the south side are triple stepped lancet windows with Tudor arched heads. Inside, there are galleries on the east and north sides.	II
Conduit mouth, Ashton Hall; 54.00935°N 2.82224°W	—	1858	The conduit consists of a stone-lined circular shaft. The walls, in sandstone, are carried by low bridges with segmental arches. Above is part of the frontispiece from the old Ashton Hall, dating from about 1600, that was moved here when the hall was demolished in the 19th century. It contains two pairs of Ionic columns on decorated pedestals, an entablature with a frieze, and a gable with ball finials.	II
