= Ashton Hall railway station =

Disused railway station in Thurnham, Lancashire

Ashton Hall
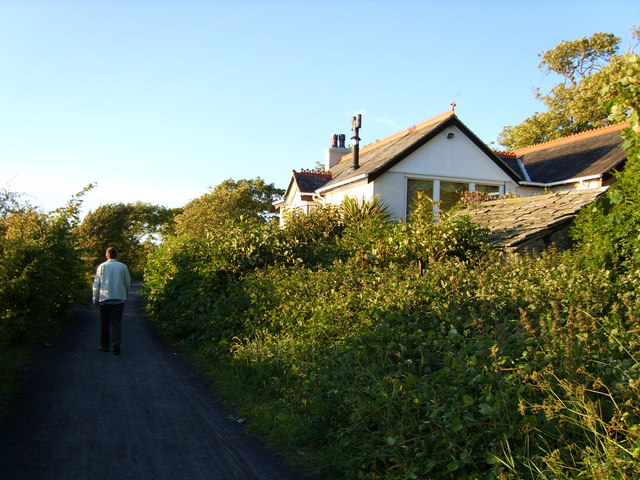
- Site of former station in 2008

General information
- Location: Thurnham, Lancashire, Lancaster; England
- Coordinates: 54.01046°N 2.83037°W
- Grid reference: SD457575

Other information
- Status: Disused

History
- Original company: London and North Western Railway
- Post-grouping: London Midland and Scottish Railway

Key dates
- 9 July 1883: Station opens as Ashton Hall
- Unknown date: Station renamed as Ashton Hall Halt
- 7 July 1930: Station closed
Location

Ashton Hall railway station was a private halt in Lancashire, England. Located on the Glasson Dock branch line, it was opened to serve Ashton Hall, the home of Lord Ashton, a local businessman. The house is now Lancaster Golf Club.

== History ==
Opened by the London and North Western Railway, the station passed to the London, Midland and Scottish Railway during the Grouping of 1923, and was closed seven years later.

| Preceding station | Disused railways | Following station |
|---|---|---|
| Lancaster Castle | London and North Western Railway; Glasson Dock Branch | Conder Green |

== The site today ==
The station still stands. The trackbed through it is now part of the Lancashire Coastal Way, and the platform is just visible from under the foliage.
