= Conder Bridge =

Bridge at Conder Green, England

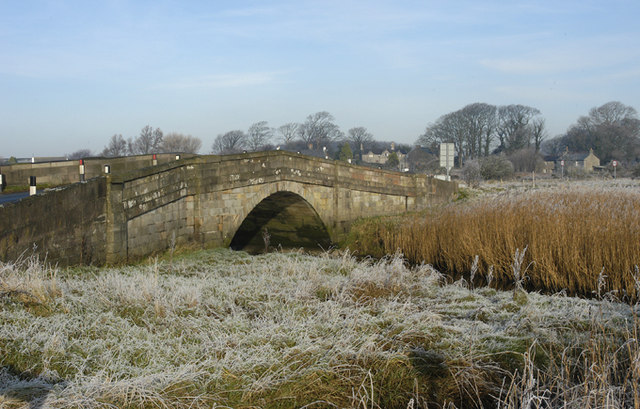
- The bridge in 2008, looking northwest
- Coordinates: 53.994863°N 2.82580797°W
- Carries: A588
- Crosses: River Conder
- Locale: Conder Green, Thurnham, Lancashire, England

History
- Opened: Early 19th century

Conder Bridge is a Grade II listed single segmental arch bridge spanning the River Conder in the English village of Conder Green, Thurnham, Lancashire. The structure dates to the early 19th century. The bridge carries the vehicular and pedestrian traffic of the A588.

The bridge is flanked by piers, with abutments also punctuated by piers. It has a solid parapet with a string course and weathered coping.

== See also ==
- Listed buildings in Thurnham, Lancashire
