= A588 =

A588 may refer to:

- A588 road, a road in the UK
- A type of Weathering steel
- The Chrysler Neon engine#A588
