= Thurnham Hall =

Country house in Thurnham, Lancaster

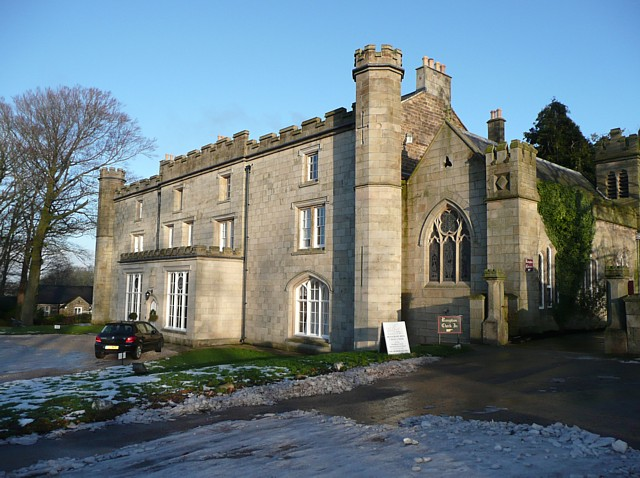
- Thurnham Hall, front, 2009

- Location within the City of Lancaster district

General information
- Location: Thurnham, Lancashire, England
- Coordinates: 53.9842°N 2.8196°W
- Completed: 17th century
- Renovated: 1973

Technical details
- Material: Sandstone rubble with ashlar west front and slate roof
- Floor count: 3
- Grounds: 30 acres (12 ha)

Website
- thurnhamhall.com

Listed Building – Grade I
- Designated: 2 May 1968
- Reference no.: 1317674

Listed Building – Grade II
- Official name: Chapel at Thurnham Hall
- Designated: 2 May 1968
- Reference no.: 1071721

Listed Building – Grade II
- Official name: The Dower House, Thurnham Hall
- Designated: 7 March 1985
- Reference no.: 1362528

Thurnham Hall is a Grade I listed 17th-century country house in the village of Thurnham, Lancashire, England, some 6 miles (10 km) south of the city of Lancaster. It is 2 miles (3.2 km) from Ashton Hall, home of the Duke of Hamilton.

It was acquired by the Dalton family in 1556 and the present building is a three-storey stone-built house, probably built in the 17th century for Robert Dalton. It stands, facing west, in 30 acres (12 ha) of rising ground about a 1/4 mile (0.4 km) from the left bank of the River Conder. The building contains an impressive Jacobean Great Hall and now functions as a resort hotel.

== History ==
In the 12th century the property belonged to the de Thurnham family; William de Thurnham granted land to the hospital of Cockersand Abbey. By descent the property was passed to the Flemming, Cancerfield, Harrington, Bonvile and Grey families. Thomas Grey, 1st Marquess of Dorset fought at the Battle of Tewkesbury (1471), and joined Buckingham's rebellion against Richard III.

Thurnam Hall was acquired by the recussant Dalton family in 1556. In 1553 Henry Grey, Duke of Suffolk, son of the 2nd Marquess and father of Lady Jane Grey, had sold the estate to Thomas Lonne, a London grocer, who resold it three years later, to Robert Dalton of Bispam, Lancashire. Robert was the grandson of William Dalton of Bispam and his wife Jane who was the daughter of Sir John Towneley (1445–1482), of the well-established English Towneley family. Robert married Ann Kitchen and the Dalton family thus acquired lands of Cockersand Abbey. Robert probably built the present house soon after the purchase.

Robert had seven, or possibly ten, daughters and one son. His only son Thomas was wounded, during the First English Civil War, at the 1644 Second Battle of Newbury and died in less than a week at Marlborough. The estate was confiscated by the Parliamentarians but was later returned, and passed to Thomas' young son Robert. Robert left only one daughter, Elizabeth, who married William de Hoghton of Park Hall, Charnock Richard and of Hoghton Tower. Their son John took the surname Dalton and was involved in the Jacobite rising of 1715. For this he was imprisoned and his land confiscated, but after his release he returned to Lancaster and paid a very large fine to recover Thurnham Hall.

John Dalton married Mary Gage, daughter of Thomas Gage, 1st Viscount Gage. John carried out some modernisation of the building in 1823, replacing the mullioned windows and the gothic windows of the front facade and adding his and his wife's coat of arms over the door. His son John died childless and so the property passed to his daughter Elizabeth in 1837, who built a private chapel at the hall in 1854. She also paid for much of a new Roman Catholic church for the village in 1848. Elizabeth lived at the hall until her death in 1861, when she was succeeded by a distant cousin, Sir James Fitzgerald, of Castle Ishen, County Cork, Ireland, who adopted the additional surname of Dalton. He also died with no children in 1867 and his brother, Sir Gerald Dalton-Fitzgerald, succeeded to the property. Sir Gerald also died without children and so the Baronetcy became extinct. Most of the contents of Thurnham were then sold and the remainder transferred to the Dalton-Fitzgerald's estate in Essex.

Ownership of Thurnham then returned to William Henry Dalton, in the main Dalton line, and in turn to his sons John Henry and William Augustus. After the latter's death the hall stood empty and became derelict. Part of the hall was damaged by fire in 1959. It was purchased in the early 1970s by Stanley Crabtree who completely renovated the building. Restoration included the facade, erected in 1823 by John Dalton, the stone dressing of which was in a dangerous condition. Interior panelling, which had been lost in the fire, was also replaced.

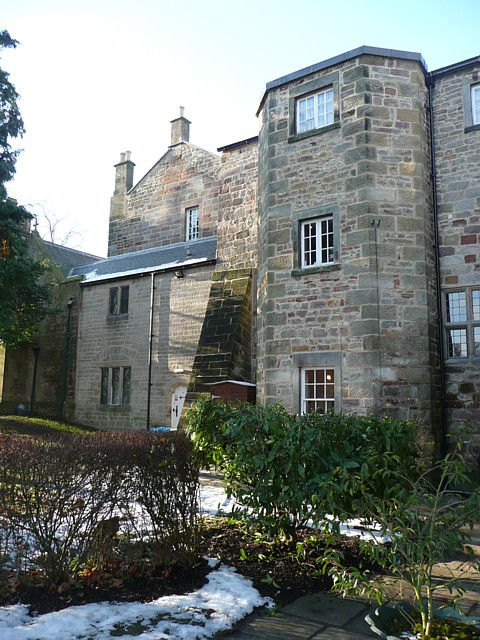
Rear of Thurnham Hall, 2009

== See also ==
- Grade I listed buildings in Lancashire
- Listed buildings in Thurnham, Lancashire
