= List of private railway stations =

Following is a list of private railway stations, stations which at some time have been private halts. It details the name of the railway station, its location, dates (where known), reason for its existence and any additional information.

Name	Location	Country	Dates	Purpose	Notes
Ballynure Halt	Clones to Dublin	Ireland	1859	Private Halt for Haire-Foster family	7 navvies died during its completion
Bermudiana	Warwick Parish	Bermuda	1931-48	Served the hotel of the same name	A walkers trail has been provided
Rani Kamalapati	Bhopal	India	Currently operating	For Operation, Maintenance and Facilities by Bansal Group under PPPModel of IR	Upgrade underway to a world-class station
Kekawaka	Trinity County, California	United States	1914-1969	Served the 26,000-acre Dean G. Witter ranch	Northwestern Pacific Railroad
Lysaghts	Spring Hill, NSW	Australia	Currently operating	For Lysaght employees only	
Marble's	Rangeley, Maine	United States	1906-1927	For patrons of the Rangeley Lake House destination hotel	Sandy River and Rangeley Lakes Railroad
River Works	Lynn, Massachusetts	United States	Currently operating	For GE Aviation employees only	
Steep Falls	Steep Falls, Maine	United States	1870-1961	Built by a lumberman to encourage railroad service to his company town	Included a second floor dance hall
Steinschal-Tradigist	Warth, Rabenstein an der Pielach	Austria	Currently operating	For patrons of the Steinschalerhof Hotel	Friends of the Mariazellerbahn

== See also ==
- List of private railway stations in Great Britain
