= Cockerham Vicarage =

Building in Lancashire, England

- Location within the City of Lancaster district

General information
- Location: Cockerham, Lancashire, England
- Coordinates: 53.9641°N 2.8180°W
- Opened: 1843

Technical details
- Material: Squared sandstone with steep slate roofs
- Floor count: 3

Design and construction
- Architect: Edmund Sharpe

Listed Building – Grade II
- Official name: The Old Rectory
- Designated: 7 March 1985
- Reference no.: 1071797

Cockerham Vicarage is in Rectory Road, Cockerham, Lancashire, England. Originally a vicarage, it was later used as a nursing home. The vicarage is recorded in the National Heritage List for England as a designated Grade II listed building. It was built in 1843 for John Dodson, the church's rector, and designed by the Lancaster architect Edmund Sharpe. It is constructed in sandstone with slate roofs. The building is in three storeys, with tall chimneys and steeply pitched gables. The doorway has a Tudor arch, and above it is a shield carved with an open Bible inscribed "ROM V" (meaning Romans, chapter 5), and a wreath inscribed with "LUCERNA PEDIBUS" (meaning "A lantern to my feet"). There is also a date stone inscribed "I.D.1843".

== See also ==
- Listed buildings in Cockerham
- List of architectural works by Edmund Sharpe
