= Christ Church, Glasson =

Coordinates: 53.9965°N 2.8427°W

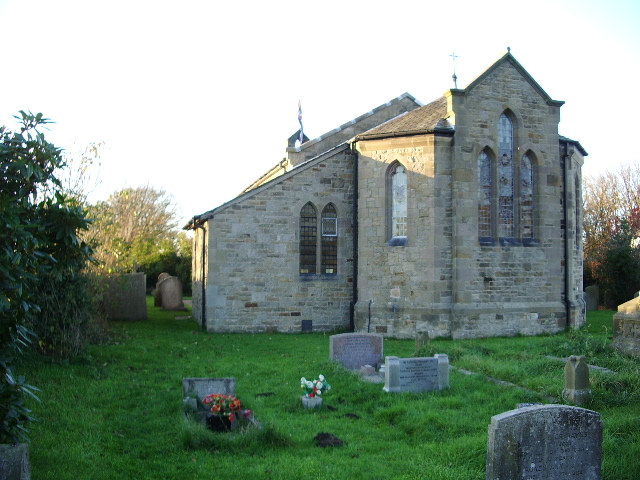
- Christ Church, Glasson, from the southeast

- Location in the City of Lancaster district
- OS grid reference: SD 448,559
- Location: Glasson, Lancashire
- Country: England
- Denomination: Anglican
- Website: Christ Church, Glasson

History
- Status: Parish church
- Consecrated: 29 June 1840

Architecture
- Functional status: Active
- Heritage designation: Grade II
- Designated: 2 May 1968
- Architect(s): Edmund Sharpe; Henry Paley
- Architectural type: Church
- Style: Gothic Revival
- Groundbreaking: 1839
- Completed: 1932

Administration
- Province: York
- Diocese: Blackburn
- Archdeaconry: Lancaster
- Deanery: Lancaster
- Parish: Christ Church, Glasson

Clergy
- Vicar: Revd Gary Lewis

Christ Church is in the village of Glasson, Lancashire, England. It is an active Anglican parish church in the deanery of Lancaster and Morecambe, the archdeaconry of Lancaster, and the diocese of Blackburn. Its benefice is combined with those of St Michael, Cockerham, and St Luke, Winmarleigh. The church is recorded in the National Heritage List for England as a designated Grade II listed building.

== History ==
Christ Church was built in 1839–40 and designed by the Lancaster architect Edmund Sharpe. It was consecrated on 29 June 1840 by the Bishop of Chester. The original chancel was "short" and "stubby", and had a triple stepped lancet east window. The present chancel and the vestry were added in 1931–32, and were designed by Sharpe's successor Henry Paley of Austin and Paley. The space under the west gallery was enclosed in 1988 to form a separate room.

== Architecture ==
The church is constructed in sandstone rubble with a slate roof. Its plan consists of a nave with a chancel at a lower level. The walls of the nave are divided by buttresses into four bays; the westernmost bays have a single lancet window, while the other three bays contain triple stepped lancets. The chancel is divided into two bays with two-light windows. The east window is a triple stepped lancet. The west end contains an arched doorway flanked by lancet windows and with another lancet above, angle buttresses; on the gable is a bellcote. Inside the church is a west gallery. The east window contains stained glass dating from 1979 by Joseph Fisher of Shrigley and Hunt. The stained glass elsewhere dates from the 19th century; some of this was designed by Carl Almquist and E. H. Jewitt of Shrigley and Hunt.

== External features ==
The churchyard contains the war graves of two soldiers of World War I, and a soldier of World War II.

== See also ==
- Listed buildings in Thurnham, Lancashire
- List of architectural works by Edmund Sharpe
- List of ecclesiastical works by Austin and Paley (1916–44)
