= Ashton Hall =

Mansion in Lancashire, England

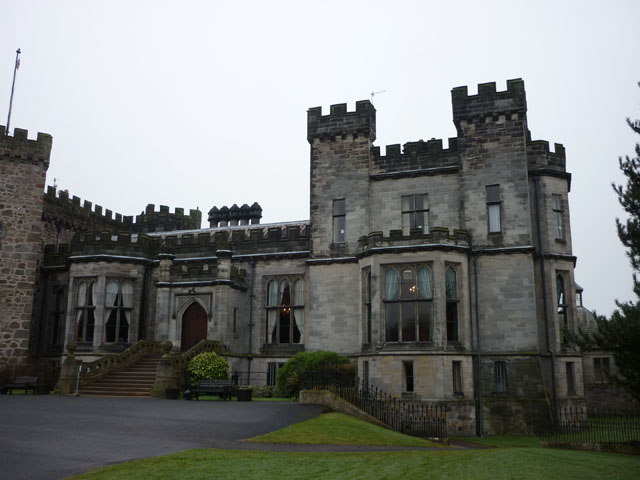

- Location within the City of Lancaster district
- 54.0089°N 2.8229°W
- Location: Thurnham, Lancashire, England

History
- Built: 14th century; 1856

Site notes
- Architect: William Le Gendre Starkie (1856)

Listed Building – Grade I
- Official name: Ashton Hall
- Designated: 31 July 1952
- Reference no.: 1071756

Ashton Hall is a largely rebuilt 14th-century mansion in the civil parish of Thurnham, Lancashire, England. It is 3 miles (4.8 km) south of the city of Lancaster and is on the east bank of the River Lune. It is recorded in the National Heritage List for England as a Grade I listed building, and is now currently owned by Lancaster Golf Club.

== History ==
Ashton Hall was mentioned as Ashton in the Domesday Book, a possession of Roger the Poitevin.

In the 13th century, the lordship of the Manor was held by the De Coucy family and from them passed to John de Coupland. The original hall dates from the late 14th century. It was probably completed in 1381, built by Edmund Lawrence.

It then passed by marriage to the Butlers of Radcliffe and from them to the Gerards of Bromley. In 1698, the estate was acquired by James Hamilton, 4th Duke of Hamilton, on his second marriage to the Gerard heiress Elizabeth Gerard. He fought a famous duel in 1712 with Lord Mohun over the right of ownership of Gawthorpe Hall and was fatally stabbed by General Macartney, Mohun's second. His widow lived for another 32 years, spending most of her time at the hall.

In 1853, the hall was sold by the Dukes of Hamilton to Le Gendre Nicholas Starkie of the wealthy Starkie family of Huntroyde Hall and in 1856 was largely rebuilt to a design by William Le Gendre Starkie. The only part of the 14th-century structure that still remains is the tower that now forms the southern wing of the hall.

After Le Gendre Starkie's death, Ashton passed to his younger son John Piers Chamberlain Starkie, who passed it in turn to his eldest son Edward Arthur Le Gendre Starkie. He sold it in 1884 to James Williamson, the linoleum manufacturer, who owned the hall until his death in 1930, but lived elsewhere. Williamson was High Sheriff of Lancashire for 1885 and on his elevation to the peerage took as his title Baron Ashton of Ashton. After his death in 1931, the major portion of the estate was purchased by William Pye and his sons. From 1883 to 1930, Ashton Hall Halt was a private railway halt serving the hall.

Ashton Hall is now owned by Lancaster Golf Club and functions as the clubhouse, with the surrounding land having been turned into a golf course in 1932. The course was designed by renowned golf course architect James Braid. The hall and land were bought by the golf club in 1993.

== Architecture ==
Ashton Hall is constructed of red and grey sandstone, with roofs of slate. Its plan is unusual, with towers set diagonally. The 19th-century building was built in the Gothic style of grey sandstone. The rectangular 14th-century tower is of red sandstone; it has angle-towers and a crenellated parapet.

The grounds of the hall have a number of other buildings. There is a sandstone ashlar gatehouse which dates from around 1600. It was extended in the 19th century. The gatehouse has a segmented arch with Doric columns. An ice house of sandstone rubble and brick stands to the north-west of the hall. This probably dates from the 19th century. There is a building to the west of the hall that was formerly a stable block and has been converted into a house. Dating from the 17th century, it is a two-storey building of sandstone rubble.

On 31 July 1952, Ashton Hall was designated a Grade I listed building. The Grade I designation (the highest of the three grades) is for buildings "of exceptional interest, sometimes considered to be internationally important". The gatehouse and the former stable block have received separate Grade II* designations. The ice house, an arched conduit mouth, a mounting block and the courtyard walls are listed at Grade II.

== See also ==
- Grade I listed buildings in Lancashire
- Listed buildings in Thurnham, Lancashire
- Ashton Hall railway station
