= River Cocker, Lancashire =

River in Lancashire, England

River Cocker
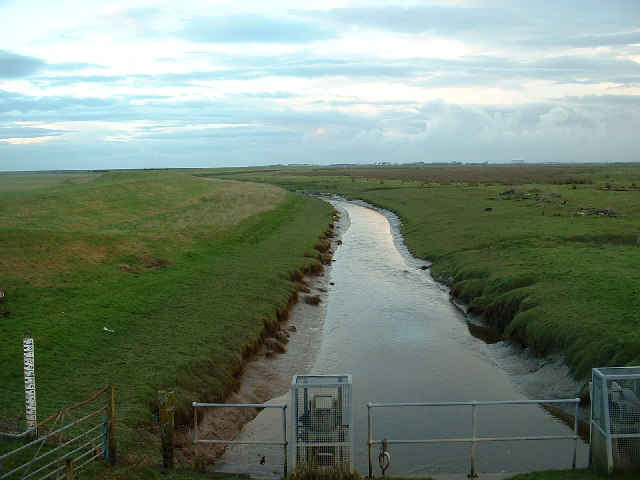
- River Cocker

- Location of the mouth in Lancashire

Location
- Country: United Kingdom
- Constituent country: England
- County: Lancashire

Physical characteristics
- Mouth: Lune estuary
  - coordinates: 53°57′59″N 2°51′25″W

The River Cocker is a river in Lancashire, England.

The River Cocker rises near to Yeat House Farm and Higher Knowe Hill south of Quernmore, near Lancaster.

It runs south westerly through Cocker Clough Wood and Brunstow Wood, then by Hampson Green, before briefly turning north west when joined by Potters Brook at the hamlet of Potters Brook close to the M6 motorway, where it is channeled under the Lancaster Canal.

The river then skirts south around Cockerham, by Little Crimbles before being swollen by Park Lane Brook and Lee Brook and flowing into saltflats below Cockersand Abbey on the Lune estuary. The river is, approximately 17.5 km (10.9 miles) in length.

Cockerham Marsh is a designated SSSI and the Cocker Estuary is a favoured overwintering site of migratory pink-footed goose, which can be seen in flocks of over one thousand, at times. It is also nationally important for other winter seabirds, including oystercatcher, turnstone, grey plover, knot, curlew, common redshank and dunlin. In summer, it hosts impressive numbers of ringed plover.

== Etymology ==
As with its Cumbrian namesake, the name is Brythonic, deriving from the word kukrā meaning "the crooked one" or "curved" (preserved as cog in Modern Welsh).

== Water quality and pollution ==
The River Cocker, along with its neighbour the River Conder lie within the Pilling, Ridgy, Cocker and Conder Operational Catchment of the Environment Agency's Lune Management Catchment. The area is heavily pastorally farmed, with extensive cattle, sheep and poultry stock and agricultural pollution is identified as the main reason that waters have yet to attain “Good” status.

United Utilities has made funding available for the “Cocker and Conder Clean Up”. Recent reporting has identified the overall quality of the water as “Moderate” for environmental pollution (ammonia and phosphates) and “Good” for chemical contamination.
