= Cockerham Mill =

- U.S. National Register of Historic Places
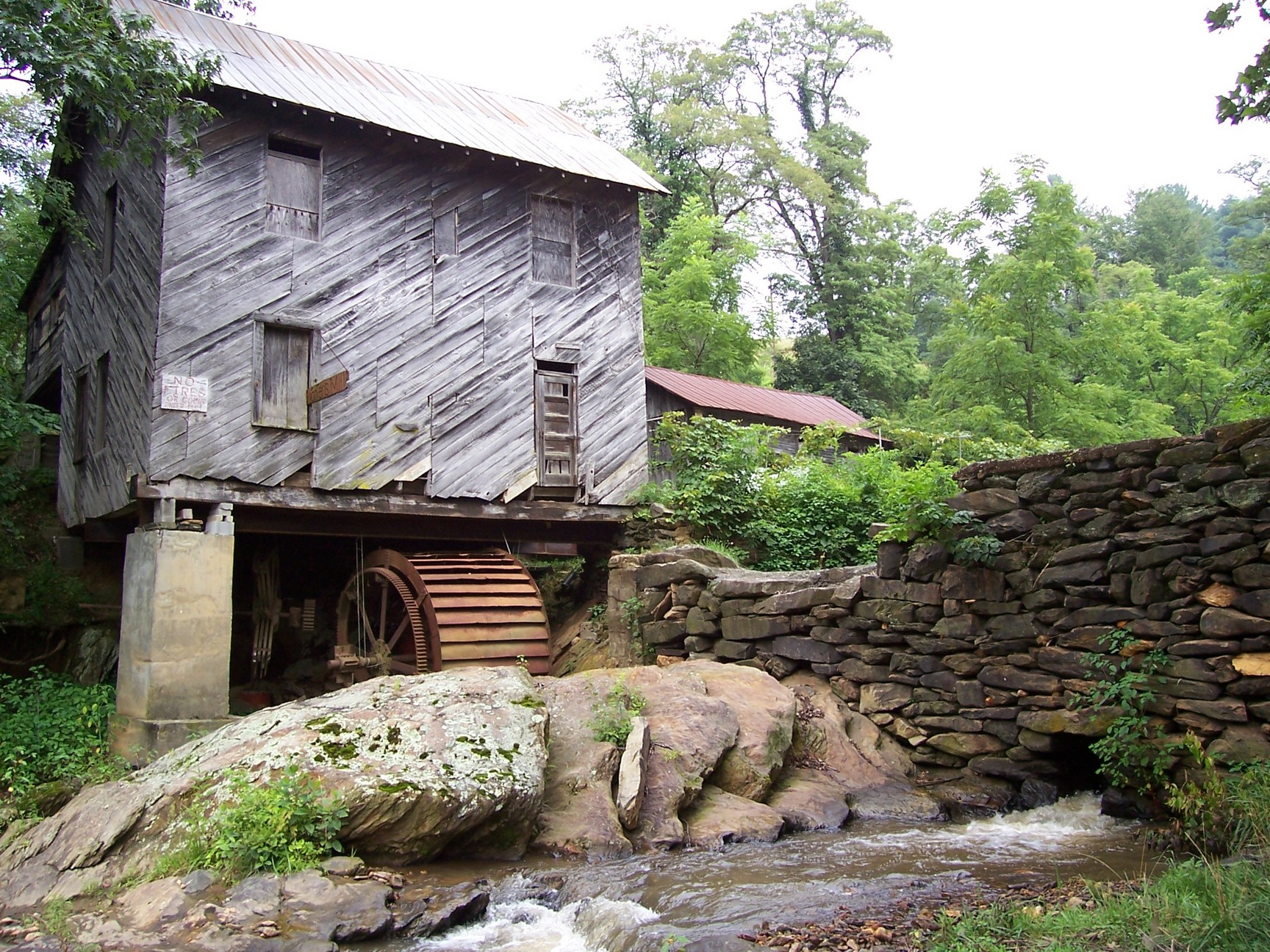

- Location within North Carolina Location within the United States
- Location: 1580 Dog Creek Rd. Extension, near Crumpler, North Carolina
- Coordinates: 36°25′19.4″N 81°23′44.5″W
- Area: 3 acres (1.2 ha)
- Built: c. 1884-1899, c. 1912, c. 1920
- NRHP reference No.: 14001022
- Added to NRHP: December 10, 2014

Cockerham Mill is a historic grist mill located near Crumpler, Ashe County, North Carolina. It was built between 1884 and 1899, and is a two-story, side-gable, building of post and beam construction. Associated with the mill is the one-and-a-half story, side-gable single-pile, miller's house (c. 1912), dam (c. 1884 - 1899), molasses cooking shed (c. 1920), and two-story frame gambrel-roof bank barn (c. 1912).

It was listed on the National Register of Historic Places in 2014.

The original dam for the mill, on Dog Creek, was wholly constructed of dry-stacked stone with a single sluice and single gate. Several attempts were made over the years to remove or demolish the dam, but it proved very sturdy, even to dynamite. The center of the dam top was dislodged by dynamite in the mid 1900s and in the late 80s was concreted over to allow large debris flows over the dam and lessen possible damage.

The mill was one of the first homes in the area to have electricity, powered by the dam itself and provided milling services for much of the valley.

The mill has undergone several attempts to maintain the structure after several, very destructive storm seasons. The original corner column of dry-stacked river rocks was cement encased in 1984 to prevent further damage from debris impacts from floods. Later, additional support beams were added under the main structure in 2004 to prevent collapse of the mill.
