= St Michael's Church, Cockerham =

Coordinates: 53.9601°N 2.8206°W

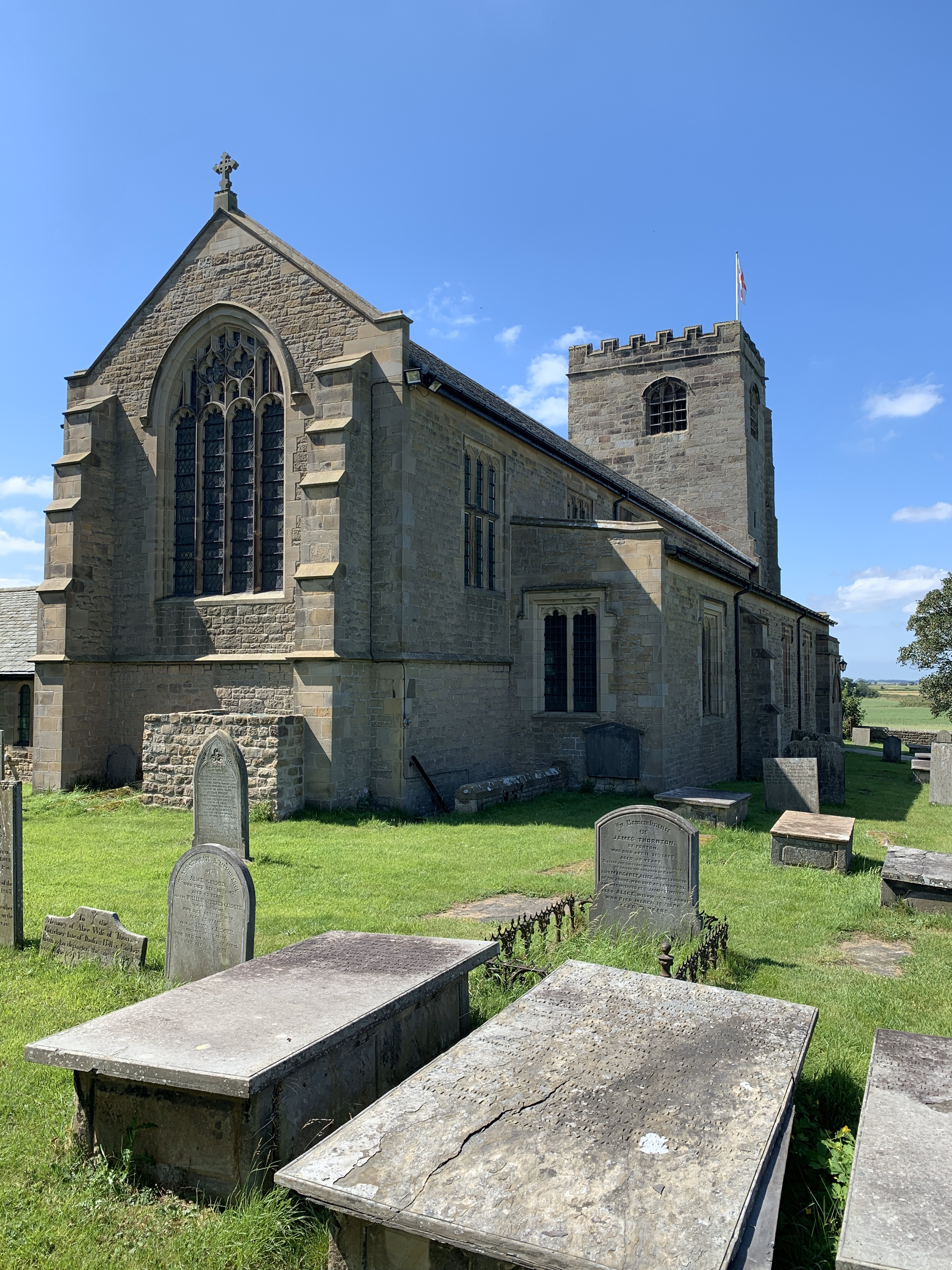
- St Michael & All Angels Church, Cockerham, from the northeast

- Location in the City of Lancaster district
- OS grid reference: SD 463,519
- Location: Cockerham, Lancaster, Lancashire
- Country: England
- Denomination: Anglican
- Website: St Michael, Cockerham

History
- Status: Parish church
- Dedication: Saint Michael

Architecture
- Functional status: Active
- Heritage designation: Grade II*
- Designated: 2 May 1968
- Architect: Austin and Paley
- Architectural type: Church
- Style: Gothic, Gothic Revival
- Completed: 1911

Specifications
- Materials: Sandstone, slate roofs

Administration
- Province: York
- Diocese: Blackburn
- Archdeaconry: Lancaster and Morecambe
- Deanery: Lancaster
- Parish: Cockerham

Clergy
- Vicar: Revd Gary Lewis

St Michael & All Angels Church is located to the southwest of the English village of Cockerham, Lancashire. It is an active Anglican parish church in the deanery of Lancaster, the archdeaconry of Lancaster and Morecambe, and the diocese of Blackburn. Its benefice is combined with those of Christ Church, Glasson, and St Luke, Winmarleigh. The church is recorded in the National Heritage List for England as a designated Grade II* listed building.

== History ==
The oldest surviving part of the original church building is the tower, which dates from the 16th century. The body of the church had been rebuilt in 1814, and this was replaced again in 1910–11 by the Lancaster architects Austin and Paley. This replacement cost £5,000 (equivalent to £510,000 in 2025).

== Architecture ==
=== Exterior ===
The body of the church is constructed in sandstone rubble, the tower in ashlar, and the roof is slated. The plan consists of a five-bay nave with a clerestory and a two-bay chancel under a continuous roof, north and south aisles, a south transept with a vestry, and a west tower. The tower is in three stages with diagonal buttresses and a battlemented parapet. On the south side is a stair turret. In the tower is a west doorway with a round arch, a three-light west window, and three-light bell openings. The windows in the sides of the aisles and clerestory corresponding to the nave have two lights, and those corresponding to the chancel have three lights. The east window has four lights containing Perpendicular tracery and ogee quatrefoils.

=== Interior ===
Inside the church, the arcades between the nave and the aisles are carried on octagonal piers with no capitals. In the chancel is a piscina and a double sedilia. The stained glass in the east window was made by Morris & Co. and depicts the Four Evangelists; the figures of Saint Matthew and Saint John are based on cartoons by Ford Madox Brown, that of Saint Mark by Edward Burne-Jones, and that of Saint Luke by William Morris. The two-manual pipe organ was made in about 1830, possibly by Renn and Boston.

== External features ==
In the churchyard is the 18th-century base of a sundial, which is listed at Grade II. The churchyard also contains the war graves of a British and a Canadian soldier of World War I.

== See also ==
- Grade II* listed buildings in Lancashire
- Listed buildings in Cockerham
- List of ecclesiastical works by Austin and Paley (1895–1914)
