= Glasson Dock branch line =

Razed railway line in Lancashire, England

Glasson Dock Branch Line
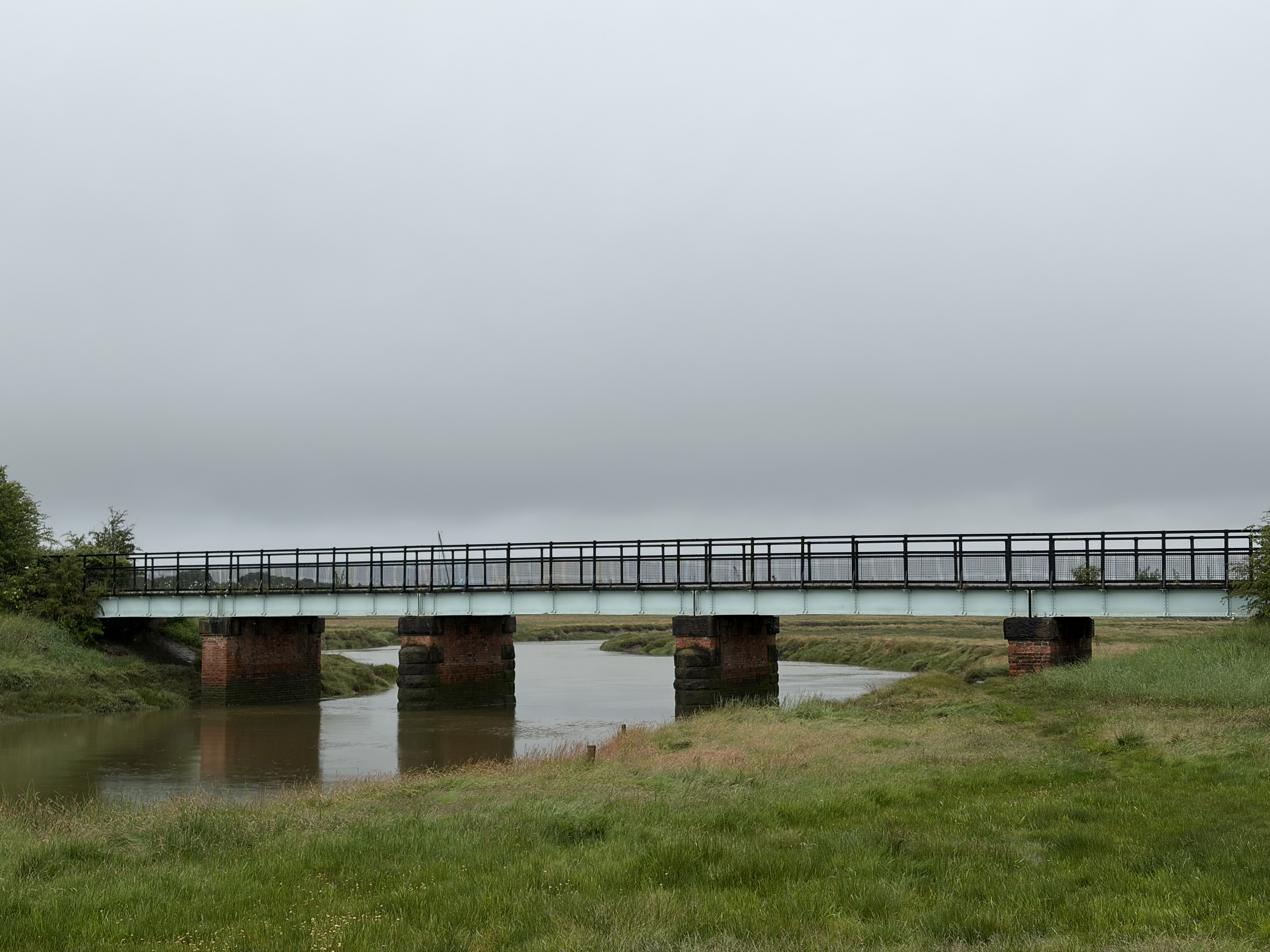
- Conder bridge, which carried the line over the river Conder on the approach to Glasson

Overview
- Locale: Lancashire, England

Service
- Operator(s): LNWR, LMS, BR

History
- Opened: 9 July 1883
- Closed: 1974

Technical
- Line length: 5 mi (8.0 km)
- Number of tracks: One
- Track gauge: 4 ft 8 1/2 in (1,435 mm) standard gauge
- Signalling: Semaphore

The Glasson Dock Branch Line was a railway line in Lancashire, England. Opened in 1883, this 5-mile branch line connected Glasson Dock to the UK rail network, connecting to the West Coast Main Line at Lancaster. It had stations at Glasson Dock and Conder Green, and a private halt at Ashton Hall. Passenger and freight services were provided. The line's success came from transporting goods to and from the dock at Glasson and to and from St Georges Quay in Lancaster. The line was razed between Glasson Dock and Freeman's Wood in 1964, and between Freeman's Wood and Lancaster in 1974.

== History ==
In 1830, Glasson Dock was generating 10,000 tons a day in freight traffic, with ships travelling between the UK mainland, the Isle of Man and elsewhere. The Glasson branch of the Lancaster Canal was considered inadequate to deal with the great amount of traffic, so, it was decided a railway line would be built in order for cargo from the dock to be transported more efficiently by rail.

The London and North Western Railway sought and were granted parliamentary approval to construct the line in June 1878 (London and North Western Railway (Additional Powers) Act 1878 (41 & 42 Vict. c. clxxxi)). Construction was relatively slow due to the marshy terrain along the bank of the river Lune and Lune estuary, nevertheless, the line was completed in 1883. Following an inspection by the railway authorities, including an inspectors train "gaily decorated with bannerettes for the occasion," the ceremonial opening of the line to the public occurred on 9 July 1883, with goods and passenger traffic commencing shortly thereafter.

=== Operation ===
Immediately following the opening of the line, the Port Authority invested in expanding Glasson Dock with new berths, wider gates, and new steam cranes to expand the capacity of the dock to provide adequate traffic for the railway, such was the prosperity of the dock at the time.

The line was primarily sustained by freight services. Some of these services would travel only on the Lancaster end of the branch. Coal, coke, materials for the production of linoleum, and other finished products for both export and import would travel to and from Lancaster's gas works, St. George's Works, and the Lune Mills. Freight along the rest of the branch was, of course, present, with materials being transferred from trains onto ships leaving the mainland, and from ships onto trains for onward distribution through the rest of the country.

Passenger services commenced sometime shortly after the line's completion in 1883, they left Lancaster Station on the westside down-bay platform.

Due to its low lying nature and its parallelism to the river Lune and then it's estuary, the line was prone to flooding.

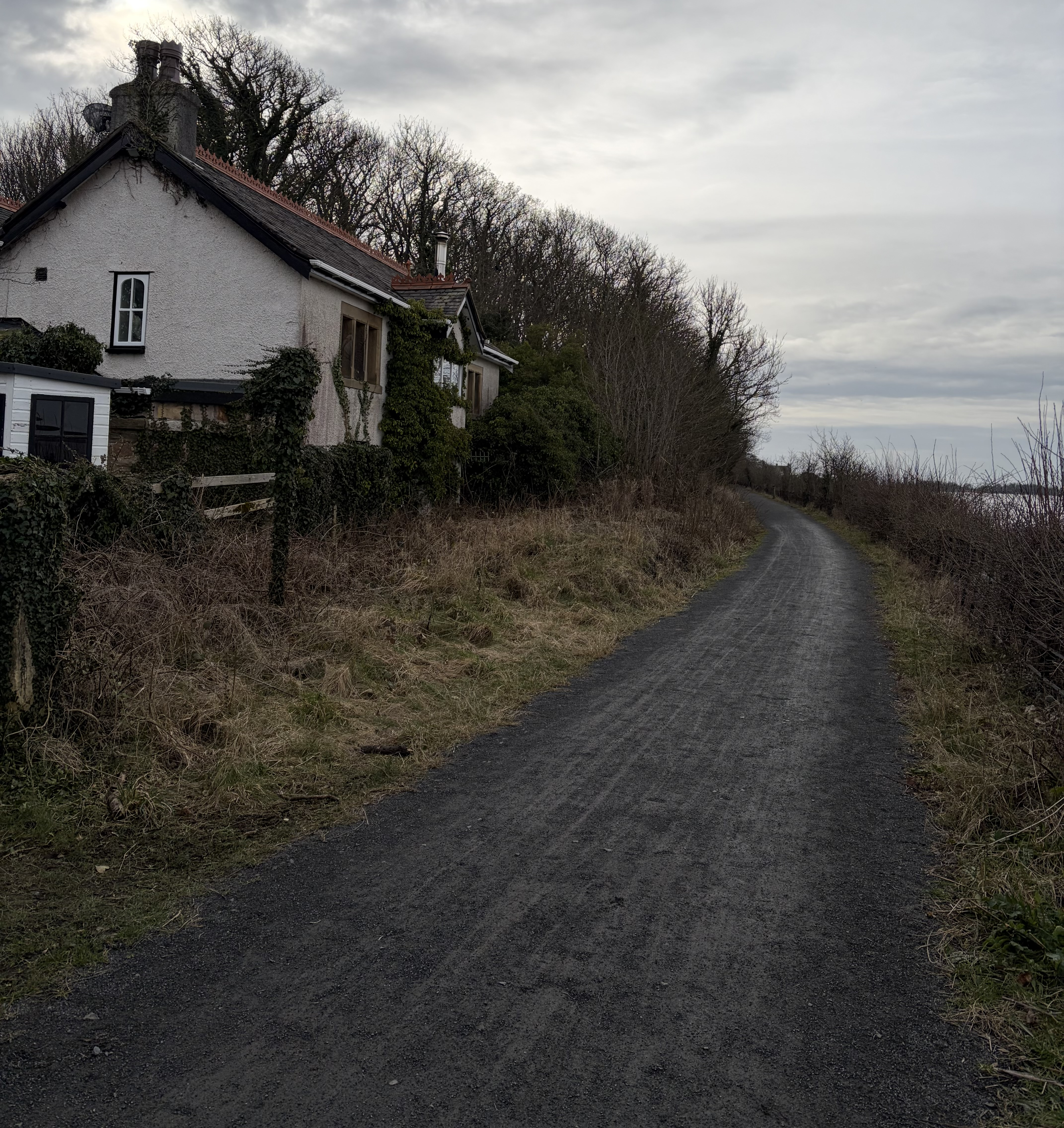
Ashton Hall Halt in 2026, the ex-trackbed is the path in the centre of the image curving left

=== Decline ===
After running for 46 years, the LMS decided to discontinue the regular timetabled passenger services on the branch in 1930 due to their being unremunerative, after which the stations and halt were run down for another 34 years, sitting disused. They were demolished with the rest of the line in 1964.

The line saw few passenger workings in the form of railtours during the intervening years between the end of its regular passenger services and its demolition, including a Stevenson Locomotive Society railtour in May 1960, and its last passenger working: a Railway Correspondence and Travel Society railtour in June 1964.

The decline of the dock in the years following WW2 together with increasing competition for freight traffic from motorised road vehicles during the 1940s, 50s and early 60s caused the progressive fall of traffic on the line, leading to the line becoming unremunerative and underutilised.

=== Closure and demolition ===
With the culture of closure and demolition in British Railways at the time; the Port Comissioners indication that they themselves could not afford the upkeep of the line; and despite local protest from the Parish council, who argued that "If British Railways were not to maintain the railway it might adversely affect the trade and commerce of the port," the line was run-down until goods services were discontinued in September 1964. The track was subsequently lifted between Glasson and Freeman's Wood on the outskirts of Lancaster in the same year.

The line was left as a smaller branch serving industry on the banks of the Lune in Lancaster until 1974, when, due to the decline of industry within Lancaster, the line was lifted in its entirety.

== Route ==
The line branched from the West Coast Main Line just north of Lancaster railway station, before declining the 1-in-50 gradient down to the River Lune. It passed St. George's Works and Williamson's Lune Mills, where a small branch originated that travelled along the Lune and connected to the riverside industry. After this, the Glasson branch would follow the Lune estuary, passing the stations of Ashton Hall Halt and Conder Green, before crossing the river Conder using the Conder Bridge and reaching Glasson Dock station. After this it split into two sidings serving the docks. The journey took 16 minutes without stopping, and 19 minutes if stops were made at both Conder Green and Ashton Hall.

=== Today ===
Between the West Coast Main Line and the banks of the river Lune, the trackbed has been built upon or otherwise integrated into the land surrounding it. From New Quay road (where the line ran parallel to the Lune) and Glasson Dock, the trackbed is extant and is used as a cycleway. The cycleway uses the trackbed between New Quay road outside of Lancaster to the dock's warehouses in Glasson. The route forms part of the larger Bay Cycle Way. Conder Green Station is still visible, as is the halt at Ashton Hall, though the building and platform at Glasson Dock have been demolished.
