= Cockerham =

Village in Lancashire, England

Coordinates: 53.966°N 2.814°W

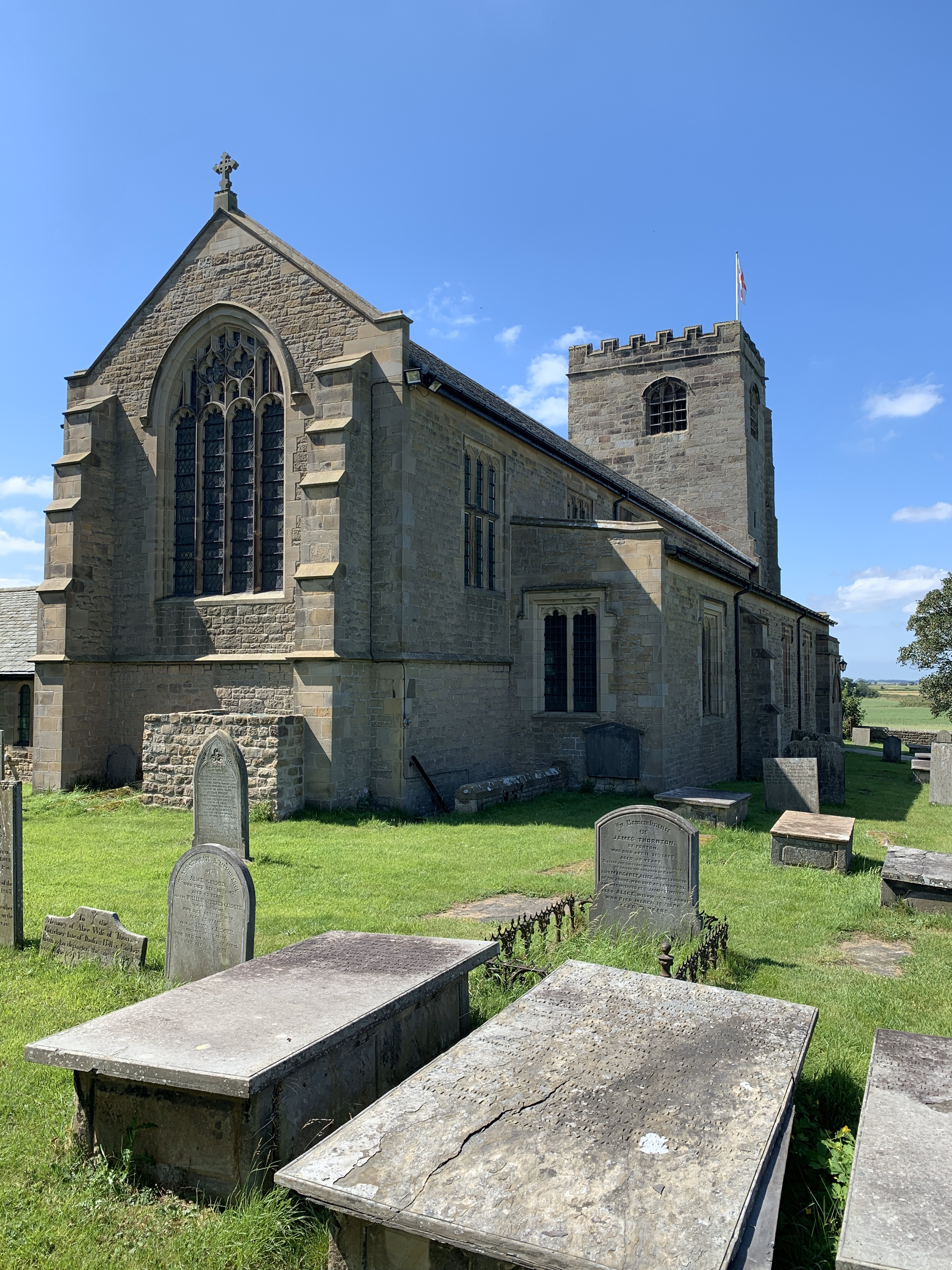
- The north-western façade of St. Michael's Church

- Location in the City of Lancaster district Location on Morecambe Bay Location within Lancashire
- Population: 694 (2021)
- OS grid reference: SD465525
  - London: 204 mi (328 km) SE
- Civil parish: Cockerham
- District: Lancaster
- Shire county: Lancashire
- Region: North West
- Country: England
- Sovereign state: United Kingdom
- Post town: LANCASTER
- Postcode district: LA2
- Dialling code: 01524
- Police: Lancashire
- Fire: Lancashire
- Ambulance: North West
- UK Parliament: Lancaster and Wyre

Cockerham is a small village and civil parish within the City of Lancaster district in Lancashire, England. It is 6 miles (9.7 km) south of Lancaster and 15 miles (24 km) north-northwest of Preston. Lying on the River Cocker, at the estuary of the River Lune, the parish had a population of 694 at the 2021 Census.

Cockerham has lain within the historic county boundaries of Lancashire since the Middle Ages, having previously formed a township and parish within the hundred of Lonsdale. Between 1894 and 1974, Cockerham lay within the Lancaster Rural District.

Medieval life of Cockerham manor has been recorded in the Custumal of the Manor of Cockerham, compiled in 1326–1327 and revised in 1463. The custumal, a record of rents and services owed by the tenants to their landlord, combines a local code of laws with an inventory of all resources of the land, from peat fuel, cattle and sheep to shoreline mussels. The tenants were forbidden to trade local fuel to the "strangers" who collected mussels on the shore.

The local church is St. Michael's. The original parish church was in the middle of the village but was resited on higher ground due to frequent flooding.

Close by are the remains of Cockersand Abbey. The village has a pub, the Manor Inn.

== Airfields ==
Cockerham Airfield (also known as Patty's Farm) is 0.75 miles (1.21 km) west of Cockerham and south of Hillam Lane. It is home to the Black Knights Parachute Centre. In 2023, former footballers Jamie Carragher, Roy Keane and Gary Neville skydived at the facility for an episode of Sky Sports' The Overlap.

Tarn Farm Airfield (also known as Rossall Field) is two miles south-west of Cockerham, on Gulf Lane. It is home of The Bay Flying Club, West Lancashire Microlight School. Its airport code is GB-0440.

== Gallery ==
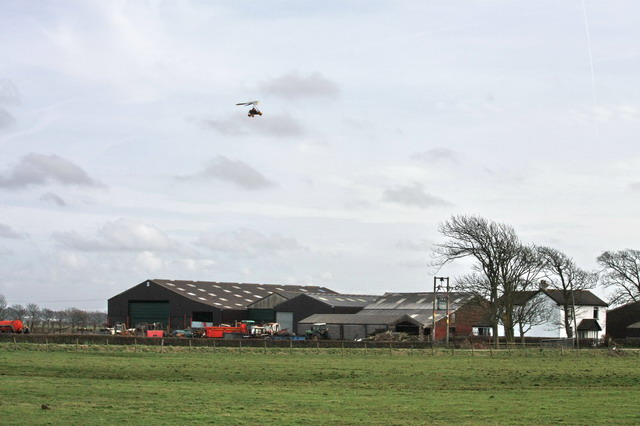
Microlight above Tarn Farm Airfield

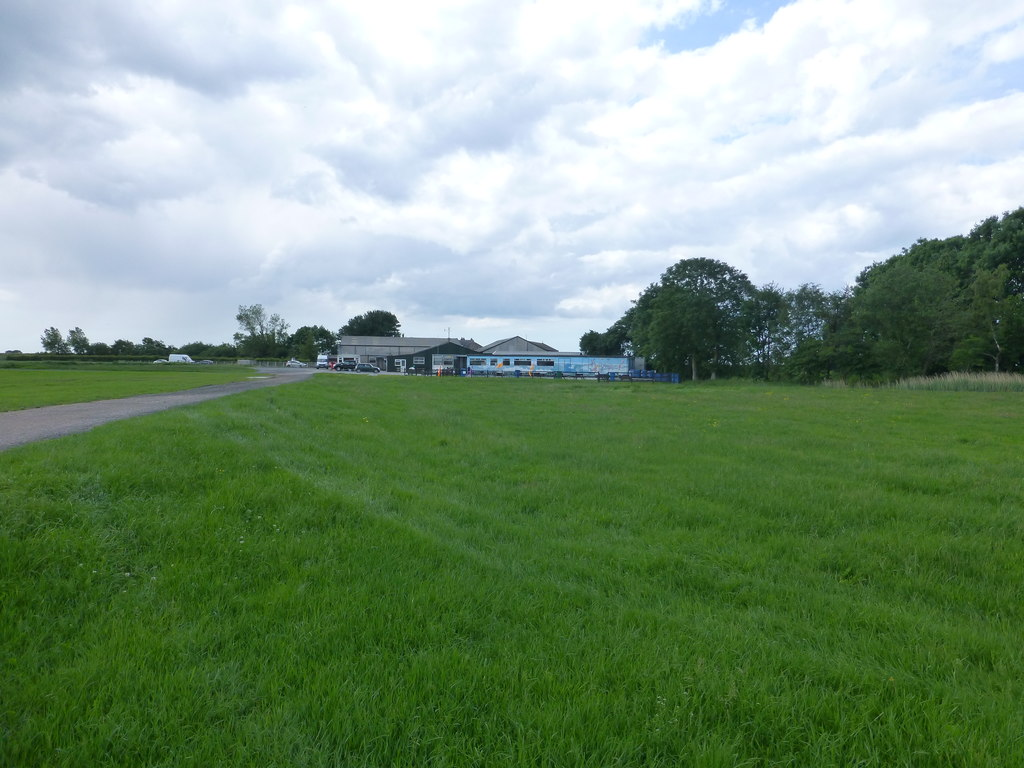
Black Knights Parachute Centre at Patty's Farm

== See also ==
- Listed buildings in Cockerham
- Leonora Carrington – British and Mexican artist, surrealist painter and novelist (1917–2011), her childhood home was Crookhey Hall at Cockerham
