= River Conder =

River in Lancashire, England

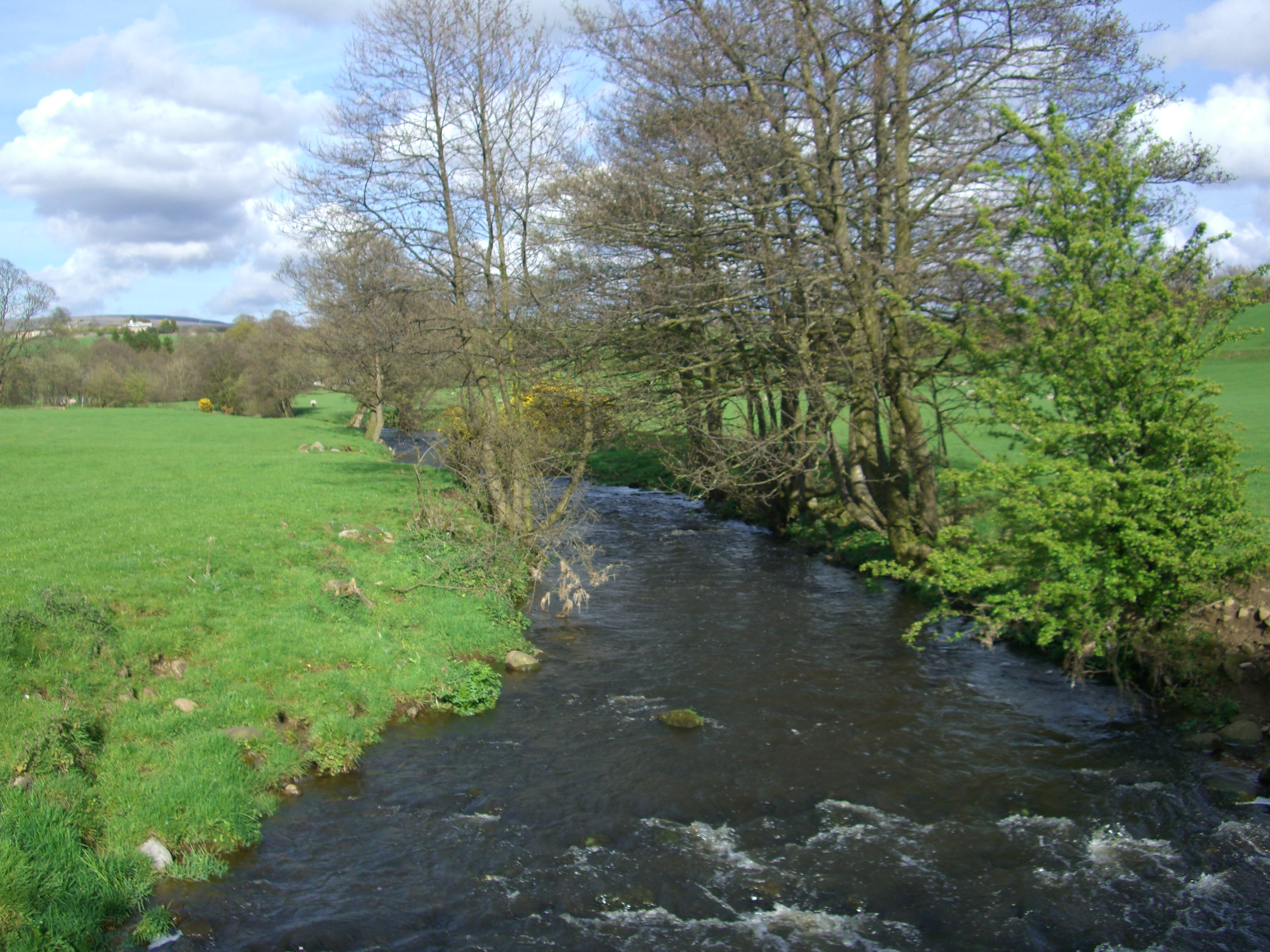
- River Conder near Ellel

- Location of the mouth within Lancashire

Location
- Country: United Kingdom
- Part: England
- County: Lancashire

Physical characteristics
- Mouth: Lune estuary
  - coordinates: 53°59′57.5″N 2°50′0″W

The River Conder is a river in the English county of Lancashire.

The source of the River Conder is a spring at Conder Head on Black Fell near Littledale, from where the stream briefly runs north, then west through Cragg Wood. The river then skirts around Quernmore in a southwesterly direction through a disproportionately wide valley, created by glacial action.

The river runs through Ellel and Galgate before turning to the north-west, flowing into the Lune estuary between Conder Green and Glasson Dock.

The river supplies most of the water for the Glasson Branch of the Lancaster Canal.

The name of the river was recorded in the 13th century as Kondover and Kondoure, being derived from Brythonic and meaning "crooked waters".

== See also ==
- Conder Bridge
