= Private railway station =

Rail stations for personal use

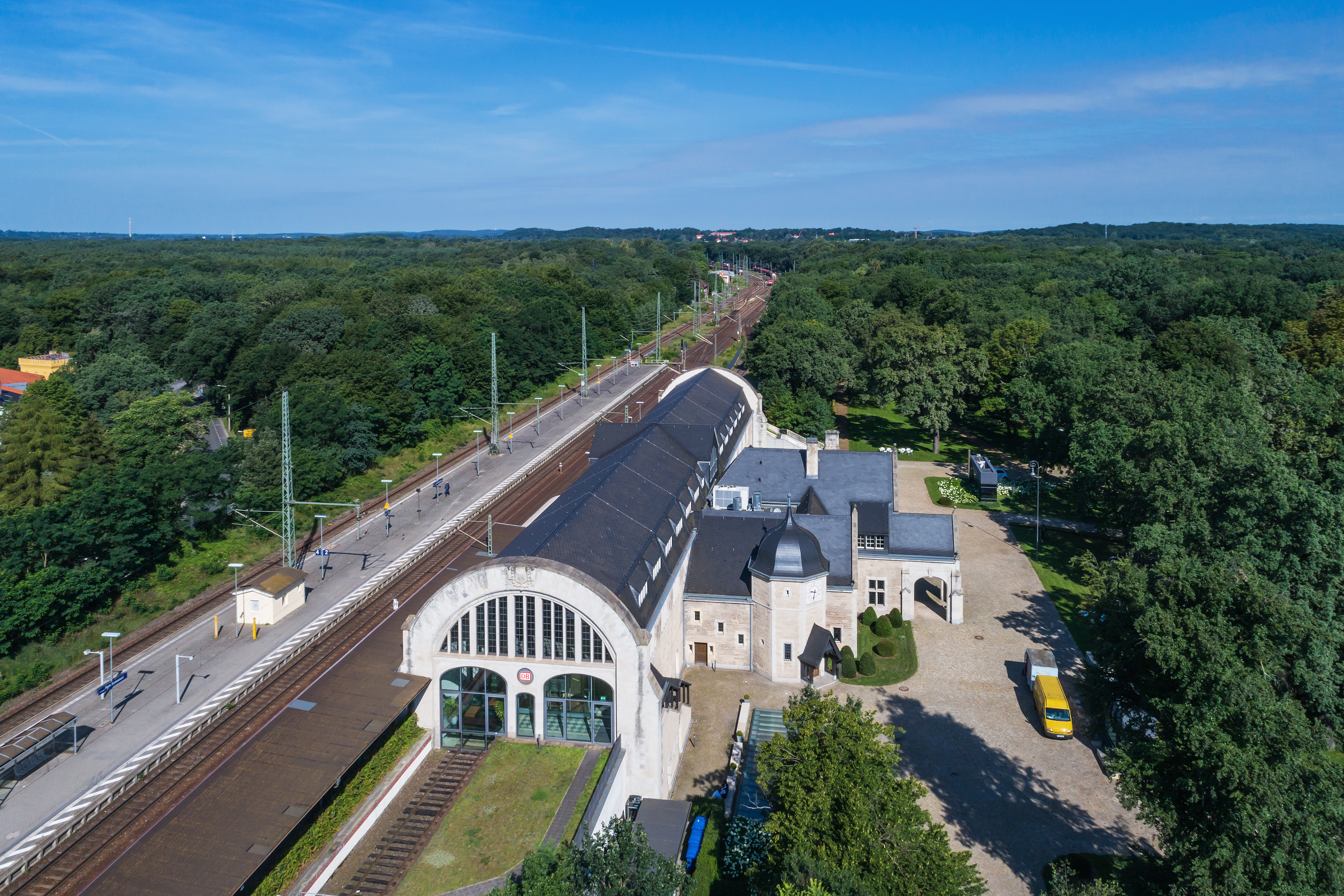
Private railway station of Kaiser Wilhelm II in Potsdam

Private railway stations were a logical development of the rapid growth in railway transportation during the 19th century. Whereas financiers looked to place their stations so as to balance the cost of the construction with expected revenue from the nearby populace, wealthy people utilised this new mode of transport by creating a halt solely for the use of their family, guests and staff.

== Examples ==
The earliest recorded such halt is Crathes Station in Aberdeenshire, built for Sir Robert Burnett of Leys in 1853. Such was his family's authority that even messenger trains run when Queen Victoria was in residence at Balmoral had to stop there, just in case he wanted to get on. There were many such lairds, although some were rather less willing to pay for their station once it was safely constructed. Some wealthy land-owners wanted the convenience of a bespoke station but did not want an unsightly intrusion onto their land, while others wanted their station to be seen from far and wide. The practice spread to Ireland and abroad: both Bermuda and Austria creating exclusive stations for upmarket hotels. Some such stations exist in rural Wales but others designed to ferry the more budget-conscious to holiday camps have disappeared as increasingly such customers ventured abroad. The uses for private halts was as diverse as their appearance: to transport farm produce, access a golf club, a remote firing range, hospital or an aircraft factory. Many took great pride in their private fiefdoms and most are remembered with great affection.

"One of the stops on the Black Isle Railway line was a private halt opened in 1894 at Rosehaugh, near Avoch for the estate owner, Mr James Douglas Fletcher. In its early days it was a great success. The only alternatives, even for a laird, were horse, bicycles or Shanks Pony but once the motor car came into its own however, the station’s use dwindled and it eventually closed in 1951".

Elizabeth Marshall, The Black Isle-Portrait of the Past

Today the term is often used jokingly for an underused station such as Emerson Park or mistakenly about remote highland stations, where it would be uneconomic to stop for the minuscule number of per annum passengers, unless requested. Many are now only remembered because of the diligent recording of railway enthusiasts

== See also ==
- List of private railway stations
- Private railroad car
- Royal waiting room
