= Lancashire Coastal Way =

66-mile footpath in Lancashire, England

- Lancashire Coastal Way logo used on waymarks
- Length: 66 mi (106 km)
- Location: Lancashire, England
- Trailheads: Silverdale; 54.1722°N 2.8341°W; Freckleton; 53.7527°N 2.8580°W
- Use: Hiking
- Elevation gain/loss: total climbed is 2,093 feet (638 m)
- Highest point: 226 ft (69 m)
- Hazards: Tidal flooding

The Lancashire Coastal Way is a long-distance footpath following the coast of the county of Lancashire in the north west of England. Its end points are Silverdale in the north and Freckleton in the south. Its length is variously asserted to be 66 miles (106 km) (Long Distance Walkers Association) or 137 miles (220 km) (Lancashire County Council).

== Route ==
The walk starts down at Freckleton, heads west along the shore to Lytham St. Annes, continues north along the coast up to Blackpool, then across the Wyre Way over the Glasson Dock harbour inlet (or through Glasson itself on alternative route), then walk along the coast, with Garstang to the east, heading north towards Lancaster, near the Caton Trail and Brookhouse, the walk continues round the coast, keeping west to Morecambe and finally reaching Silverdale at the head of the trail.

From Silverdale the Cumbria Coastal Way offered an opportunity to continue the coastal walk to Gretna, but is no longer a recognised path.
