= Glasson Dock =

Village in Lancashire, England

Coordinates: 53.997°N 2.849°W

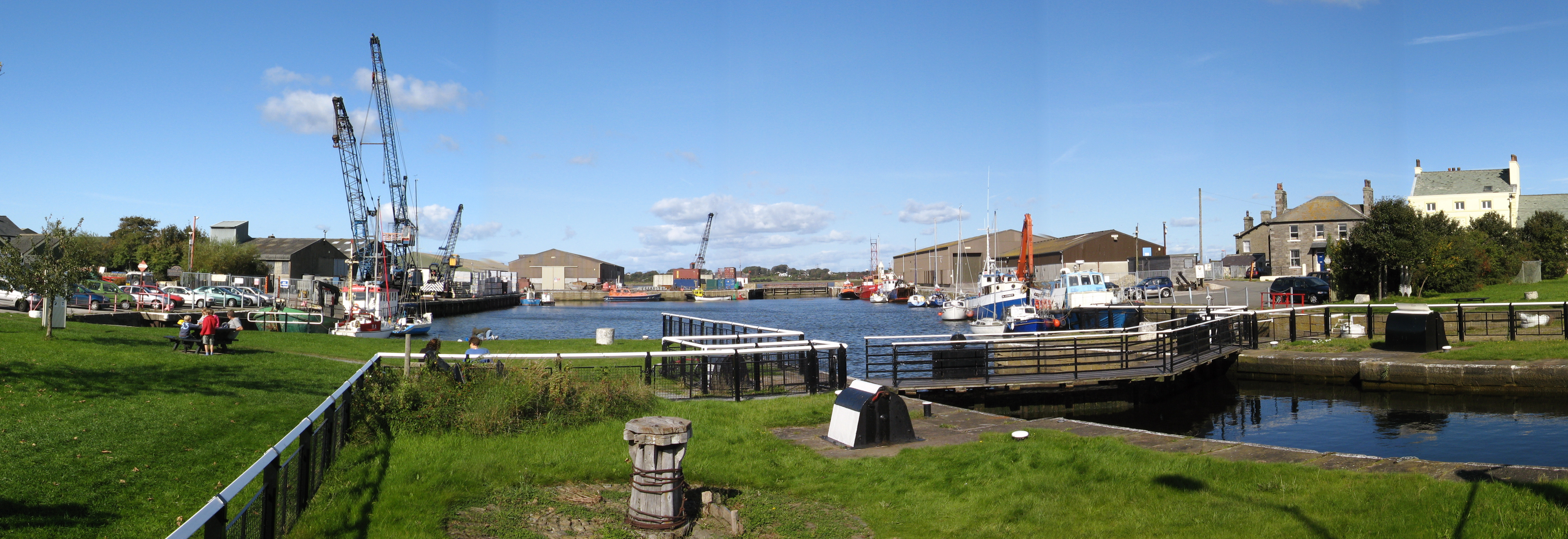
- The lock at Glasson Dock

- Location in the City of Lancaster district Location within Lancashire
- OS grid reference: SD443561
- Civil parish: Thurnham
- District: Lancaster
- Shire county: Lancashire
- Region: North West
- Country: England
- Sovereign state: United Kingdom
- Post town: LANCASTER
- Postcode district: LA2
- Dialling code: 01524
- Police: Lancashire
- Fire: Lancashire
- Ambulance: North West
- UK Parliament: Lancaster and Wyre

Glasson Dock, also known as Glasson, is a village in Lancashire, England, south of Lancaster at the mouth of the River Lune. In 2011, it had a population of around 600.

== History ==
Glasson was originally a small farming and fishing community (which is now known as Old Glasson and Brows-saltcote); the village of Overton lies directly across the river from Glasson.

In 1779, the Lancaster Port Commission decided to build a dock at Glasson because of the difficulties of navigating up the River Lune to the port at Lancaster. Land was purchased in 1780, with work commencing by 1782. A pier was constructed but there were problems and the west wall began to bulge. In August 1782, the commissioners asked Henry Berry, who was employed as the engineer for the Liverpool docks, to arbitrate in the dispute with the contractor, and to design a dock, to be located by the pier. Berry was unable to do so, as he was so busy, and so the engineer Thomas Morris was asked instead. He produced plans in November 1783, for a project which involved rebuilding the bulging wall, and the construction of another short pier from the opposite bank of the river, so that gates could be fitted between the two. The estimated cost was £2,700, and Mr. Fisher was appointed as the new contractor, with Morris acting as engineer for a salary of £100 per year. Construction was finished by March 1787, when the dock opened, with Morris remaining as engineer until December. The dock was well equipped and could hold up to 25 merchant ships.

In 1792, with the construction of the Lancaster Canal underway, thought was given to building a connection between it and merchant shipping. John Rennie's plans for a Glasson branch formed the basis for the Lancaster Canal Act 1793 (33 Geo. 3. c. 107) which was obtained in May 1793. However, after no work took place, it was not until 1819 that the plans were revived, when the Lancaster Canal Navigation Act 1819 (59 Geo. 3. c. lxiv) was passed to raise additional finance for the project. The estimated cost of the branch was £34,608, and work began in 1823. The 2.5-mile (4.0 km) branch dropped through 52 feet (16 m) from Galgate, and the basic engineering was completed in December 1825, but financial difficulties meant that warehousing and wharves could not be constructed at first, and so the build-up of trade was slow. However, by 1830 over 10,000 tons of goods passed through the dock, most of it passing on to the canal. Because the locks were 14 feet (4.3 m) wide, smaller ships did not have to tranship their cargoes to canal boats, as they could sail through the dock and along the canal. The first such boat to do so was a schooner called Sprightly, which carried slate to Preston in May 1826. Incoming trade included slate, timber, potatoes and grain, while coal was exported through the port to Ulverston, North Wales and Ireland.

As the ships using the dock did not require significant amounts of local labour, the settlement around the dock did not grow significantly. Many of the buildings in the village were built in the 19th century, including Christ Church, which was built in 1840, although expanded in 1931–32. A shipyard and Customs House were built in 1834, a Watch House in 1836, and a Dry Dock in 1841. The shipyards were largely concerned with ship repair rather than shipbuilding, eventually closing in 1968, with the dry dock filled in a year later.

The quay was connected to the railway network at Lancaster in 1883, by a 5 mile branch line that operated until the cessation of passenger services on 5 July 1930. Goods rail traffic continued until 7 September 1964. The trackbed of the disused branchline is now a linear park and cycleway that forms part of the larger Bay Cycle Way.

A limited amount of commercial traffic still uses the dock, with outbound shipments including coal for the Isle of Man and the Western Isles of Scotland, and incoming cargoes including animal foodstuffs and fertilizer, which are stored in the sheds located on the dock side.

=== Ship building ===
A number of ships were built in Glasson Dock:

- Anna (1835)
- Carrie Bell (1862) built by Matthew Simpson
- Englishman (1864) built by Matthew Simpson
- Dairy Maid (1867) built by Matthew Simpson
- James & Mary (1867) built by Matthew Simpson
- Red Rose (1879) built by Matthew Simpson

== Operations ==
Maritime vessel entering the dock can only do so during limited tidal windows because the River Lune contains very little water at low tide, and mooring is not possible outside the dock entrance. As the channel varies its course, shipping can only safely navigate with high tides. The dock gates are only opened for a period starting 45 minutes before high water and ending at high water. The entrance to the dock is controlled by traffic lights and travelling down river is only safe for an hour immediately after high water.

The dock is connected by a lock to Glasson Basin Marina, which has mooring facilities for 220 boats, and a wide range of boating services including chandlery, facilities for the repair of boats, a wet dock, slipway and a hoist with a capacity of 35 tons for cranage.

== The Victoria Inn ==
The owners of the Victoria Inn, then one of the village's two public houses (the other being the Dalton Arms), submitted plans in 2019 to change the use of the premises to having a bar on the ground floor only, with two holiday flats on the first floor and two residential flats on the second floor. The building has Grade II listed status. It is constructed of rendered stone with a slate roof, it has three storeys and a symmetrical front of three bays. In the outer bays are two-storey canted bay windows. The windows in the lower two floors are sashes, and the central doorway has a plain surround.

== Gallery ==
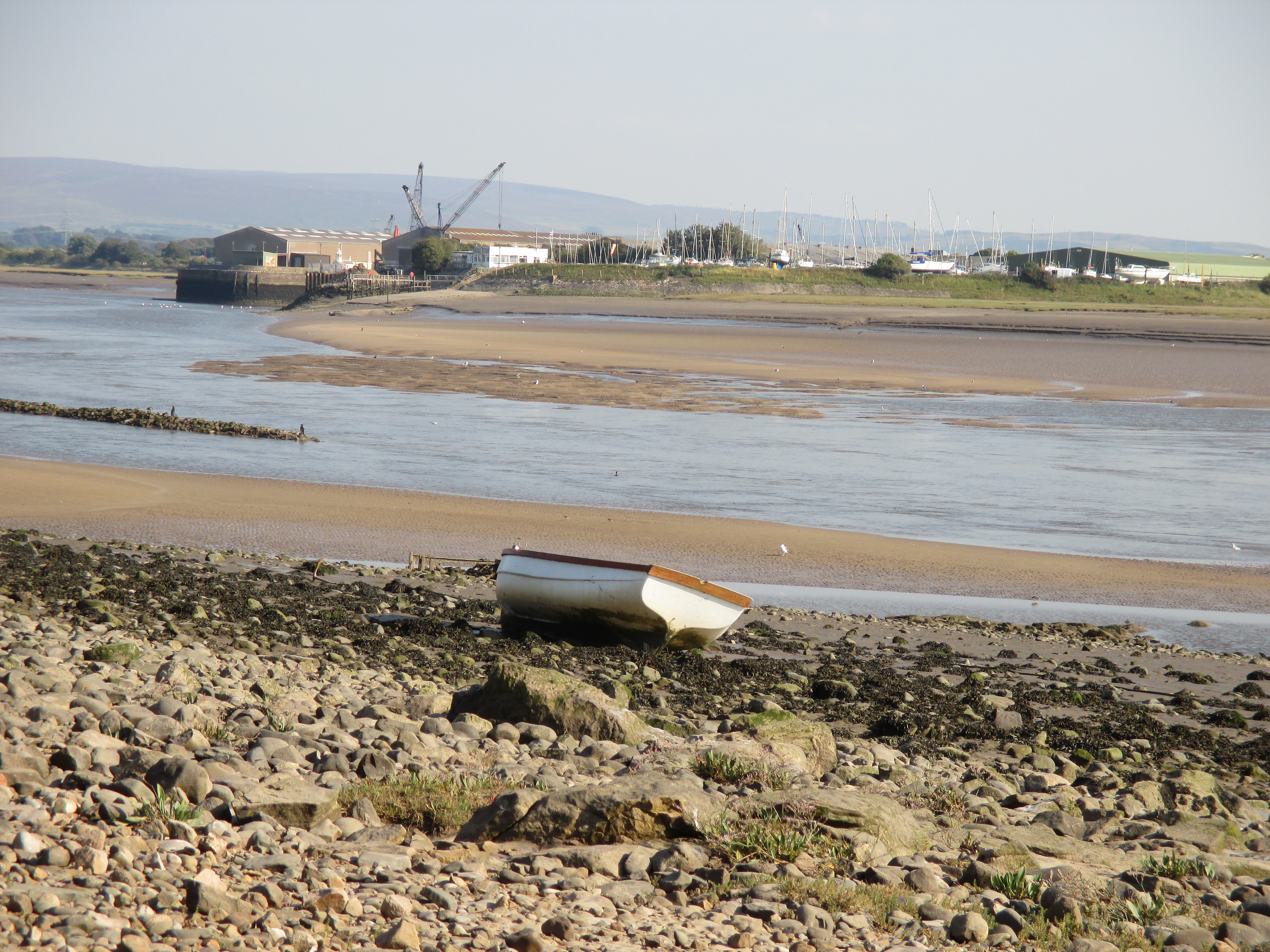
River Lune, at Bazil Point, Overton, Lancashire, looking towards Glasson Dock at low tide

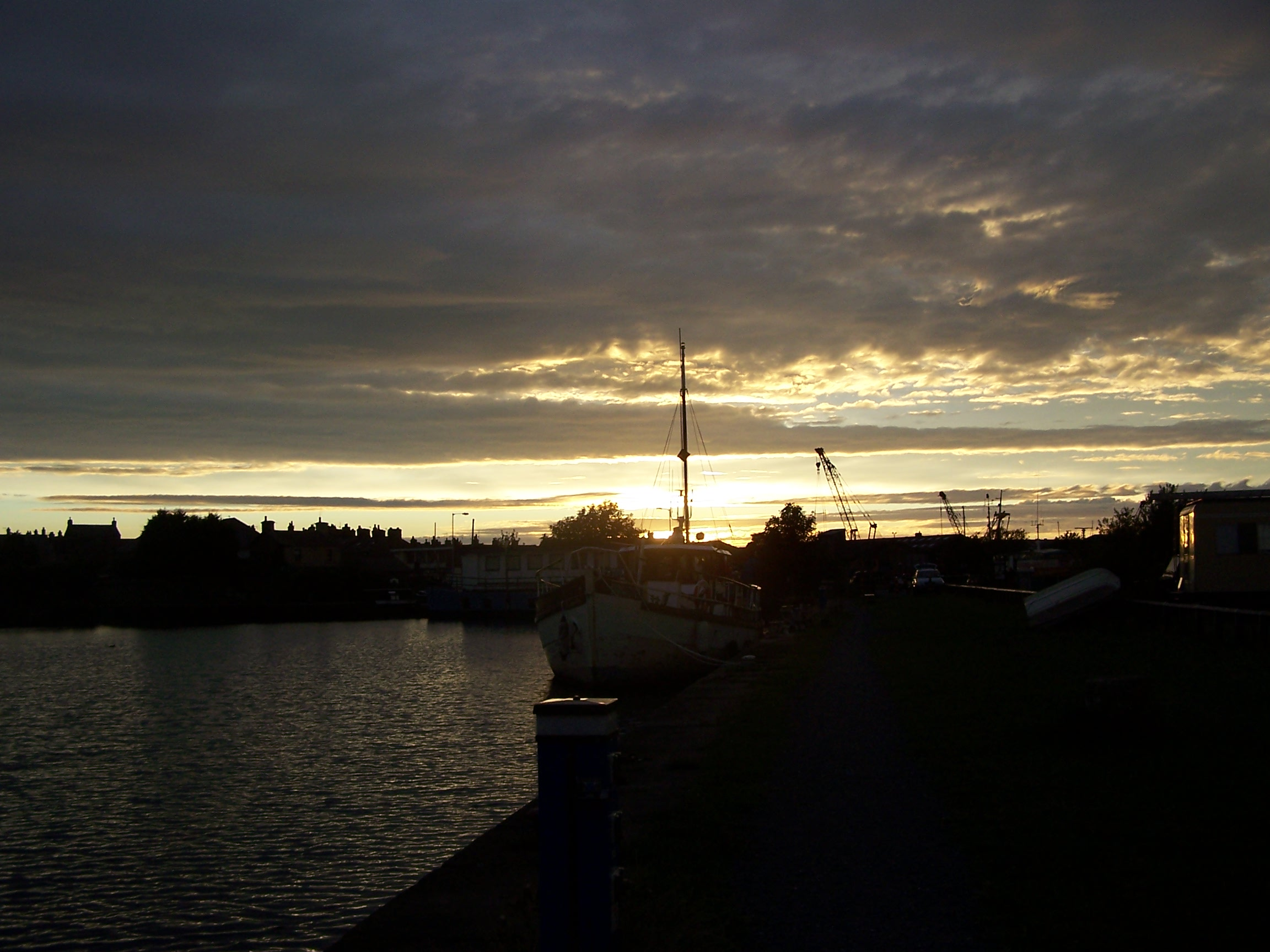
Sunset over Glasson Dock

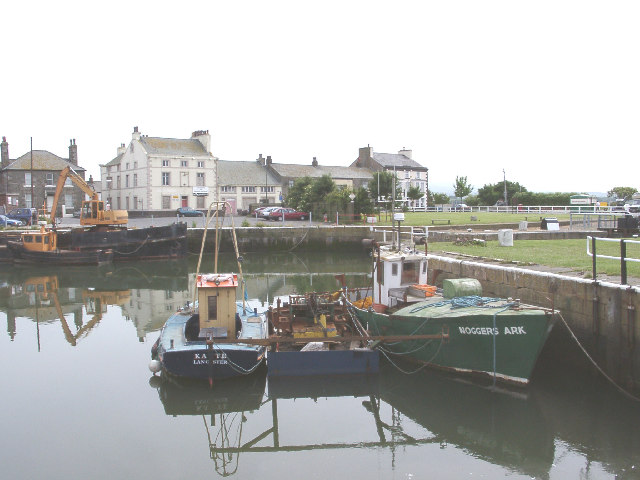
Glasson Dock

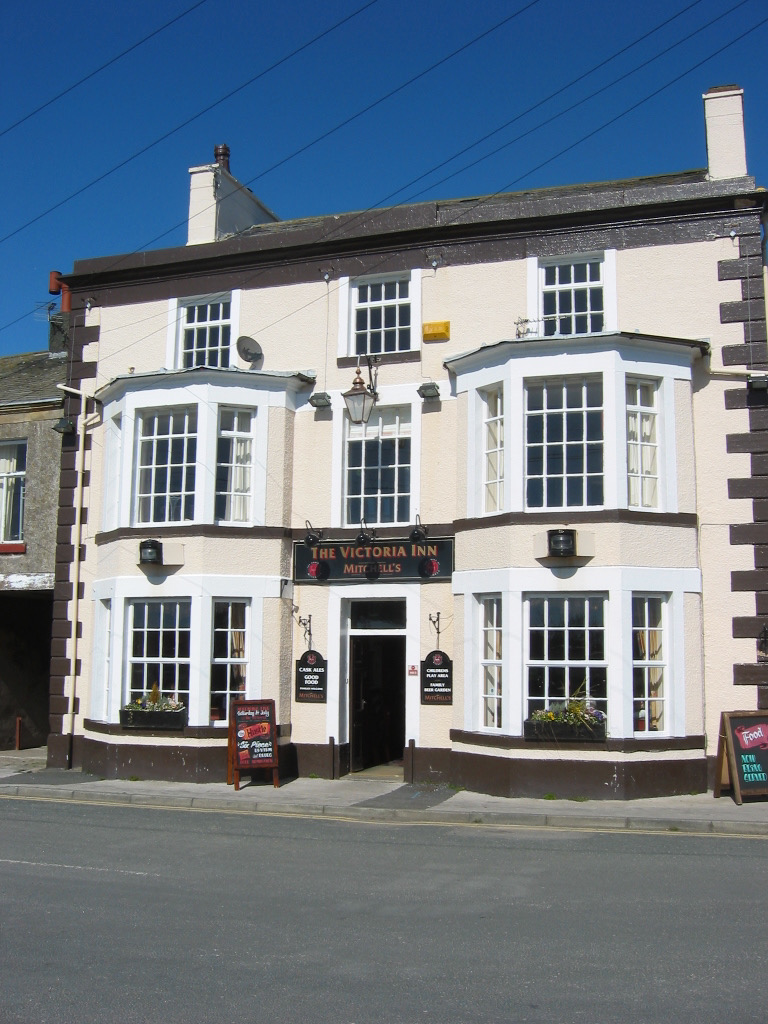
The Victoria Inn, in Victoria Terrace, pictured in 2006

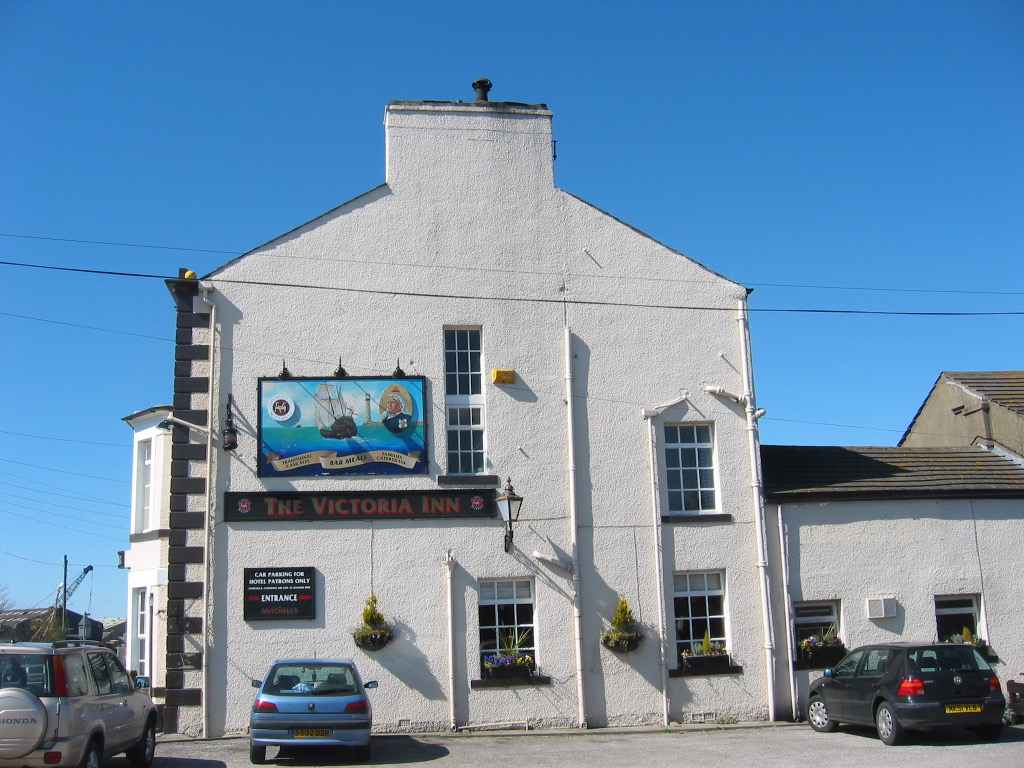
The eastern side of the inn

== See also ==
- Scheduled monuments in Lancashire
- Listed buildings in Thurnham, Lancashire
- Canals of the United Kingdom
- History of the British canal system
- Waring & Gillow

=== References ===
Sources

- Hadfield, Charles; Biddle, Gordon (1970). The Canals of North West England, Vol 1 (pp.1-236). David and Charles. ISBN 978-0-7153-4956-4.
- Skempton, Sir Alec; et al. (2002). A Biographical Dictionary of Civil Engineers in Great Britain and Ireland: Vol 1: 1500 to 1830. Thomas Telford. ISBN 978-0-7277-2939-2.
- Hartwell, Clare; Pevsner, Nikolaus (2009) [1969], Lancashire: North, The Buildings of England, New Haven and London: Yale University Press, ISBN 978-0-300-12667-9
- Historic England, "Victoria Hotel, Thurnham (1164656)", National Heritage List for England
