= Thurnham, Lancashire =

Village in Lancashire, England

Coordinates: 53.99°N 2.83°W

Thurnham
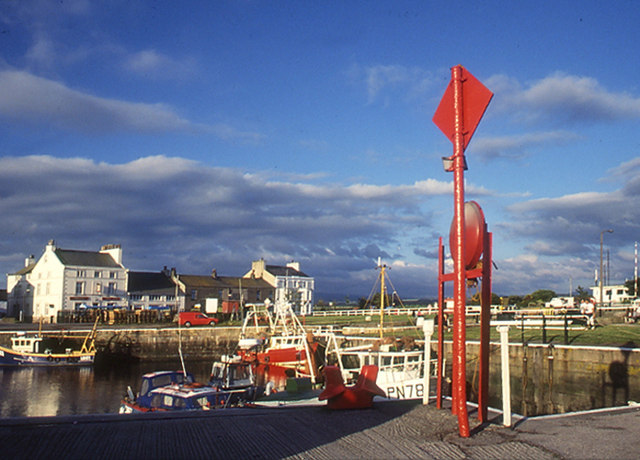
- Glasson Dock

- Location in the City of Lancaster district Location within Lancashire
- Population: 651 (2011)
- OS grid reference: SD4654
- Civil parish: Thurnham
- District: Lancaster
- Shire county: Lancashire
- Region: North West
- Country: England
- Sovereign state: United Kingdom
- Post town: LANCASTER
- Postcode district: LA2
- Dialling code: 01524
- Police: Lancashire
- Fire: Lancashire
- Ambulance: North West
- UK Parliament: Lancaster and Wyre

Thurnham is a civil parish in Lancashire, England. It is situated on the south side of the River Lune estuary in the City of Lancaster, and contains the villages of Conder Green, Glasson Dock, Lower Thurnham and Upper Thurnham. The parish has a population of 595, increasing to 651 at the 2011 census.

Thurnham is where the River Conder flows into the Lune. The main road through the parish is the A588. It was formerly served by the London and North Western Railway's Glasson Dock Branch railway line, which had three stations in the parish: one at Conder Green, the terminus at Glasson Dock and a private halt at Ashton Hall.

To the east of the village stands Thurnham Hall, a 17th-century country house converted to a resort hotel. It was originally the residence of John Pierce Chamberlain Starkie (1830–1888).

== See also ==
- Listed buildings in Thurnham, Lancashire
