= High Sheriff of Lancashire =

English ceremonial officer

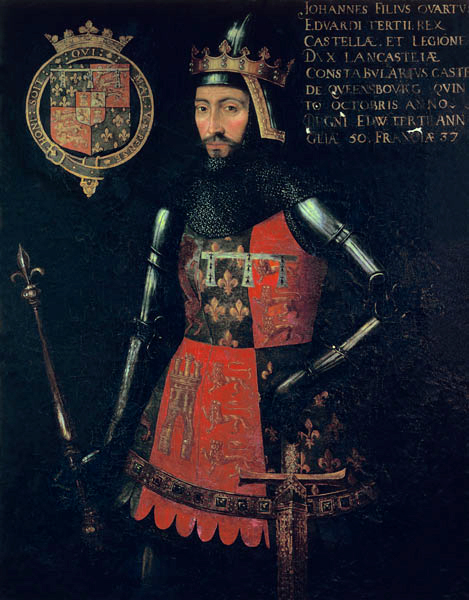
John of Gaunt was the Sheriff of Lancashire in the years 1362–1371.

The High Sheriff of Lancashire is an ancient office, now largely ceremonial, granted to Lancashire, a county in North West England. High Shrievalties are the oldest secular titles under the Crown, in England and Wales. The High Sheriff of Lancashire is the representative of the monarch in the county, and is the "Keeper of The King's Peace" in the county, executing judgements of the High Court through an Under Sheriff.

Throughout the Middle Ages, the High Sheriff was a powerful political position; the sheriffs were responsible for the maintenance of law and order and various other roles. Some of its powers were relinquished in 1547 as the Lord Lieutenant of Lancashire was instated to deal with military duties. It was in 1908 under King Edward VII of the United Kingdom that the Lord Lieutenant position became more senior than the High Sheriff. Since that time the High Sheriff has broadly become an honorific title, with many of its previous roles having been taken up by High Court judges, magistrates, coroners, local authorities, and the police.

The sheriff conventionally serves for a term of a year, with the term of office starting in March. Unlike other counties, apart from Merseyside and Greater Manchester, the honour in Lancashire is bestowed by the monarch in their role as Duke of Lancaster, by pricking the Lites. This page lists persons to have held the position, and is divided by sovereign state and Royal house. Another list of sheriffs of Lancashire from 1087 to 1886 is compiled in Edward Baines's "History of the County Palatine and Duchy of Lancaster". This names many other individuals for the earliest years of the office.

In April 2015 Amanda Parker of Browsholme Hall, Clitheroe, became High Sheriff and launched a website to promote the office: highsheriffoflancashire.co.uk.

== Part of the Kingdom of England ==
=== House of Plantagenet ===
- 1150–1160 Bertram de Bulmer of Brancepeth and Sheriff Hutton
- 1160–1162 Geoffrey de Valoignes of Farleton and Cantsfield
- 1162–1166 Sir Bertram de Bulmer of Brancepeth and Sheriff Hutton
- 1166–1170 William de Vesci, Lord of Alnwick
- 1170–1173 Roger de Herleberga
- 1173–1174 Ranulf de Glanvill
- 1174–1185 Ralph FitzBernard
- 1185–1185 Hugo Pipard
- 1185–1188 Gilbert Pipard
- 1188–1189 Peter Pipard
- 1189–1194 Richard de Vernon (1st term)
- 1194–1194 Theobald Walter, 1st Baron Butler
- 1194–1196 Benedict Garnet, of Caton
- 1196–1197 Robert de Vavasour of Hazelwood, Tadcaster
- 1197–1198 Nicholas le Boteler
- 1198–1199 Stephen of Thornham
- 1199–1200 Robert de Tatteshall, near Pontefract
- 1200–1204 Richard de Vernon (2nd term)
- 1204–1205 Sir William Vernon
- 1205–1215 Gilbert FitzReinfrid, Baron of Kendal
- 1205–1215 Adam FitzRoger of Yealand (1st term)
- 1215–1216 Reginald de Cornhill of Kent
- 1216–1217 Ranulph de Blundevill
- 1217–1222 Jordan FitzRoger
- 1223–1223 Stephen de Segrave
- 1223–1226 Robert de Montjoy
- 1226–1227 William de Ferrers, 4th Earl of Derby
- 1227–1228 Gerard Etwell of Etwall, Derbyshire
- 1228–1232 Sir Adam de Yealand (2nd term)
- 1232–1232 Peter de Rivaux
- 1232–1233 William de Lancaster, Baron of Kendal
- 1233–1234 Gilbert de Wyteby
- 1234–1240 Simon de Thornton "Clericus"
- 1240–1241 John de Lancaster
- 1241–1245 Robert de Waterfal
- 1245–1246 Richard le Boteler
- 1246–1247 Sir Matthew de Redmayne, Lord of Levens
- 1247–1255 Sir Robert de Lathum
- 1255–1259 Sir Patrick de Ulvesby
- 1259–1259 Sir William le Boteler, Lord of Warrington
- 1259–1261 Sir Geoffrey de Chetham
- 1261–1264 Sir Adam de Montalt
- 1264–1267 Roger de Lancaster, Lord of Rydal
- 1267–1269 Edmund, 1st Earl of Lancaster
- 1269–1270 Sir Richard le Boteler of Rawcliffe, Fylde
- 1270–1272 John de Cansfield of Aldingham
- 1272–1274 Sir Ranulph de Dacre of Dacre, Cumberland
- 1274–1284 Sir Henry de Lea of Preston
- 1284–1290 Gilbert de Clifton
- 1291–1298 Sir Ralph de Montjoy
- 1298–1298 Thomas, 2nd Earl of Lancaster
- 1298–1301 Richard de Hoghton
- 1301–1307 Sir Thomas Travers
- 1307–1309 William Gentyl the elder of Poulton-le-Sands
- 1309–1315 Sir Ralph de Bickerstath of Bickerstaffe (died of wounds after Battle of Preston, 1315)
- 1315–1317 Sir Edmund de Neville from Hornby
- 1317–1320 Sir Henry de Malton of Malton, Yorkshire
- 1320–1322 William Gentyl the younger
- 1322–1323 Robert de Leyburn (1st term)
- 1323–1323 John Darcy
- 1323–1326 Sir Gilbert de Southworth of Southworth, Warrington
- 1326–1326 Robert de Leyburn (2nd term, died in office)
- 1326–1327 Sir Geoffrey de Warburton
- 1327–1327 Henry, 3rd Earl of Lancaster
- 1327–1328 John de Burghton
- 1328–1329 John de Hamburg
- 1329–1332 Sir John de Denum
- 1332–1335 Robert Foucher
- 1335–1336 William de Clapham of Clapham, Yorkshire
- 1336–1337 Sir William le Blount (killed in office)
- 1337–1342 Robert de Radcliffe of Ordsall, Salford
- 1342–1344 Sir John le Blount (brother of Sir William, HS 1336)
- 1344–1345 Stephen de Ireton
- 1345–1345 Henry, 1st Duke of Lancaster
- 1345–1350 John Cockayne
- 1350–1358 Sir William Scargill
- 1358–1359 William de Radcliffe
- 1359–1361 Nicholas de Coleshill
- 1361–1361 Sir John de Ipres
- 1361–1362 Adam de Hoghton
- 1362–1371 John of Gaunt, 1st Duke of Lancaster
- 1371–1371 Richard de Radcliffe
- 1371–1374 Sir John le Boteler of Warrington and Beausay
- 1374–1377 Richard de Towneley
- 1377–1384 Sir Nicholas Haryngton of Farleton in Lonsdale
- 1384–1387 Sir Ralph de Radcliffe of Blackburn and Smithills Hall
- 1387–1392 Robert de Standish
- 1392–1397 Sir John le Boteler
- 1397–1399 Richard Molyneux

=== House of Lancaster ===
- 1399–1399 Sir Richard de Hoghton of Hoghton Tower
- 1399–1401 Sir Thomas Gerard of Bryn Hall, Ashton-in-Makerfield, Lancs.
- 1401–1404 Sir John de Boteler
- 1404–1405 Sir Ralph Radcliffe
- 1405–1406 John Boteler
- 1406–1411 Sir John Bold
- 1411–1415 Sir Ralph Staveley
- 1415–1416 Sir Robert de Urswyk
- 1416–1418 Nicholas de Longford
- 1418–1422 Sir Robert Lawrence
- 1423–1426 Richard Radcliffe
- 1426–1437 Robert Laurence of Ashton
- 1439–1449 Sir John Byron of Clayton Hall
- 1449–1461 Nicholas Byron

=== House of York ===
- 1461–1462 John Broughton of Broughton
- 1462–1464 Sir John Assheton of Ashton-under-Lyne
- 1464–1465 John Pilkington of Pilkington
- 1465–1466 Thomas Pilkington of Pilkington
- 1466–1473 Sir Robert Urswick of Urswick
- 1473–1480 Thomas Molyneux of Sefton
- 1480–1485 Sir Thomas Pilkington of Pilkington

=== House of Tudor ===
- 1485–1497 Sir Edward Stanley of Hornby Castle
- 1497–1524 Lawrence Starkie of Huntroyde
- 1523 Sir Alexander Radcliffe of Ordsall
- 1524 Sir William Molyneux of Sefton Hall
- 1526 Henry Farington of Farington, Leyland and Old Worden Hall
- 1527 Sir William Leylond of Morley in Astley
- 1528 Sir Alexander Osbaldestone of Osbaldestone
- 1529 Sir Alexander Radcliffe
- 1530 Sir Richard Assheton of Middleton Hall
- 1531 Henry Farington of Farington, Leyland and Old Worden Hall
- 1532 Sir John Towneley of Towneley
- 1533 Sir Edmund Trafford of Trafford Park
- 1534 Sir Thomas Langton of Newton-in-Makerfield
- 1535 Sir Thomas Boteler of Bewsey
- 1536 Thomas Shireburne of Aighton and Mitton
- 1536 Hugh Adlington of Adlington and Duxbury
- 1537 Sir Thomas Halsall of Halsall
- 1538 John Holcroft of Melling
- 1539 Sir Alexander Radcliffe
- 1540 Sir William Laylond of Morley-in-Astley
- 1541 Sir Richard Hoghton of Lea and Hoghton
- 1542 Sir Thomas Southworth of Southworth and Samlesbury Halls.
- 1543 John Holcroft of Melling
- 1544 Sir Marmaduke Tunstall of Thurland Castle
- 1545 Sir William Norris of Speke Hall
- 1546 Sir Thomas Holcroft of Vale Royal
- 1547 Sir Alexander Radcliffe of Ordsall
- 1548 Sir Thomas Gerard of Bryn
- 1549 Sir Robert Worsley of Boothes
- 1550 Sir Peter Legh of Hayock
- 1551 Sir John Atherton of Atherton Hall, Leigh
- 1552 Sir Thomas Talbot of Lower Darwen
- 1553 Sir Thomas Gerard of Bryn
- 1554 Sir Marmaduke Tunstall of Thurland Castle
- 1555 Sir John Atherton of Atherton Hall, Leigh
- 1556 Sir Thomas Langton of Newton-in-Makerfield
- 1557 Sir Edmund Trafford of Trafford Park
- 1558 Sir Thomas Gerard of Bryn Hall
- 1559 John Talbot of Salesbury
- 1560 Sir Robert Worsley of Booths
- 1561 Sir John Atherton of Atherton Hall, Leigh
- 1562 Sir John Southworth of Samlesbury Hall
- 1563 Sir Thomas Hesketh of Rufford Old Hall
- 1564 Thomas Hoghton of Hoghton
- 1565 Sir Edmund Trafford of Trafford
- 1566 Sir Richard Molyneux of Sefton
- 1567 Sir Thomas Langton of Newton-in-Makefield
- 1568 Edward Holland of Denton Hall
- 1569 John Preston of Preston Hall, Westmorland
- 1570 Thomas Boteler of Bewsey and Warrington
- 1571 Edmund Trafford of Trafford
- 1572 John Byron of Clayton Hall.
- 1573 Richard Holland of Denton Hall and Heaton Hall
- 1574 William Booth of Barton
- 1575 Francis Holt of Gristlehurst, Bury
- 1576 Richard Bold of Bold, Warrington
- 1577 Robert Dalton of Thurnham Hall
- 1578 John Fleetwood of Penwortham
- 1579 Ralph Assheton of Middleton
- 1580 Sir Edmund Trafford of Trafford
- 1581 Sir John Byron of Clayton Hall
- 1582 Richard Holland of Denton
- 1583 John Atherton of Atherton Hall
- 1584 Sir Edmund Trafford of Trafford
- 1585 Thomas Preston of Preston Hall
- 1586 Richard Assheton of Middleton
- 1587 John Fleetwood of Penwortham
- 1588 Thomas Talbot of Bashall
- 1589 Sir Richard Molyneux of Sefton
- 1590 Richard Bold of Bold, Warrington
- 1591 James Assheton of Chadderton
- 1592 Edward Fitton (the younger) of Gawsworth Old Hall
- 1593 Richard Assheton of Middleton
- 1594 Ralph Assheton of Great Lever
- 1595 Thomas Talbot of Bashall
- 1596 Richard Holland of Denton
- 1597 Sir Richard Molyneux of Sefton
- 1598 Richard Assheton of Middleton
- 1599 Sir Richard Hoghton of Hoghton
- 1600 Robert Hesketh of Rufford and Martholme
- 1601 Cuthbert Halsall of Halsall
- 1602 Sir Edmund Trafford of Trafford
- 1603 John Ireland of Hale

=== House of Stuart ===
- 1604 Sir Nicholas Mosley of Manchester
- 1605 Ralph Barton of Bolton-le-Moors
- 1606 Edmund Fleetwood of Rossall
- 1607 Sir Richard Assheton of Middleton
- 1608 Robert Hesketh of Rufford Old Hall
- 1609 Sir Edmund Trafford of Trafford
- 1610 Roger Nowell of Read Hall
- 1611 John Fleming of Coniston Hall
- 1612 Sir Cuthbert Halsall of Halsall
- 1613 Robert Bindlosse of Borwick Hall
- 1614 Richard Shireburne of Stonyhurst
- 1615 Edward Stanley of Bickerstaffe
- 1616 Rowland Mosley of Hough End, Manchester
- 1617 Sir Edmund Trafford of Trafford
- 1618 Richard Shuttleworth of Gawthorpe Hall
- 1619 John Holt of Stubley
- 1620 Leonard Ashawe of Ashawe
- 1621 Edward Moore of Bank Hall, Liverpool
- 1622 Sir Gilbert Ireland of Hale Hall, Childwall
- 1623 Sir George Booth of Ashton-under-Lyne
- 1624 Sir Ralph Assheton of Whalley
- 1625 Edward Holland of Denton
- 1626 Roger Kirkbye of Kirkby Ireleth
- 1627 Sir Edward Stanley of Bickerstaffe
- 1628 Edmund Assheton of Chadderton
- 1629 Edward Rawsthorne of Edenfield
- 1630 Thomas Hesketh of Rufford Old Hall
- 1631 Richard Bold of Bold Hall, St Helens
- 1632 Nicholas Towneley of Royle, Burnley
- 1633 Ralph Assheton of Middleton
- 1634 Ralph Standish of Standish
- 1635 Sir Humphrey Chetham. of Clayton Hall
- 1636 William Farrington of Leyland
- 1637 Richard Shuttleworth of Gawthorpe Hall
- 1638 Roger Kirkby of Kirkby Ireleth
- 1639 Sir Edward Stanley of Bickerstaffe
- 1640 Robert Holt of Castleton
- 1641 Peter Egerton of Shaw Hill, Flixton
- 1642 Sir John Girlington of Thurland Castle
- 1643 Sir Gilbert Hoghton of Hoghton Tower
- 1644–1647 John Bradshaw of Bradshaw Hall, Bolton
- 1648 Gilbert Ireland of Hale Hall, Childwall

=== Commonwealth ===
- 1649 Humphrey Cheeton
- 1649 John Hartley of Strangeways, Manchester
- 1650 Edmund Hopwood of Hopwood Hall, Middleton
- 1651 Henry Wrigley of Chamber Hall, Oldham
- 1652 Alexander Barlow of Barlow, Salford
- 1653 John Parker of Extwistle, Briercliffe
- 1654 Peter Bold of Bold Hall, Warrington
- 1655–1656 John Atherton of Atherton
- 1656 John Starkie of Huntroyde Hall
- 1657 Hugh Cooper of Chorley and Carnforth
- 1658 Sir Robert Bindlosse, 1st Baronet of Borwick Hall, Carnforth
- 1659 Sir Richard Hoghton, 3rd Baronet of Hoghton Tower

=== House of Stuart, restoration ===
- 1660 George Chetham of Clayton Hall
- 1661 Sir George Middleton of Leighton Hall, Carnforth
- 1663 John Girlington of Thurland Castle
- 1664 Thomas Preston of Holker, Furness
- 12 November 1665: William Spencer, of Ashton Hall
- 7 November 1666: Sir John Ardene, of Harden
- 6 November 1667: Thomas Greenhalgh, of Brandlesholme
- 6 November 1668: Thomas Greenhalgh, of Brandlesholme
- 11 November 1669: Christopher Banastre of Bank Hall, Bretherton
- 4 November 1670: Sir Henry Sclater, of Light Oaks, near Leigh
- 9 November 1671: Sir Robert Bindlosse, 1st Baronet, of Borwick Hall, Carnforth
- 11 November 1672: Sir Robert Bindlosse, 1st Baronet, of Borwick Hall, Carnforth
- 12 November 1673: Sir Peter Brooke, of Astley Hall
- 5 November 1674: Alexander Butterworth, of Belfield, Butterworth
- 10 November 1676: Alexander Rigby, of Layton, Poulton-le-Fylde
- 14 November 1678: Sir Roger Bradshaigh, 1st Baronet, of Haigh Hall, near Wigan
- 1 December 1679: William Johnson, of Rishton Grange, Clitheroe
- 30 October 1680: Lawrence Rawstane, of New Hall, Edenfield
- 1682–1683 Thomas Legh of Bank, Leyland
- 1684–1685 Peter Shakerley of Shakerley, Tyldesley
- 1686–1688 William Spencer of Ashton Hall
- 1689 John Birch of Birch Hall, Manchester
- 1690 Peter Bold of Bold, Warrington
- 1691 Alexander Rigby of Whittle-le-Woods and Layton, Liverpool
- 1692 Francis Lindley of Bowling Hall
- 1693 Thomas Rigby of Whittle-le-Woods
- 1694 Thomas Ashurst of Ashurst, near Wigan
- 1695 Richard Spencer of Preston
- 1696 Thomas Norreys of Speke Hall, Liverpool
- 1697 Roger Mainwaring of Clitheroe
- 1698 William West of Middleton, Near Heysham
- 1699 Robert Dukinfield of Dukinfield, Ashton-under-Lyne
- 1700 Thomas Rigby of Goosnargh
- 1701 William Hulme of Davyhulme, near Manchester
- 1702 Roger Nowell of Read Hall, Blackburn
- 1703 Peter Egerton of Shaw Hill, near Manchester
- 1704 George Birch then Thomas Birch of Birch Hall, Rusholme
- 1705 Richard Spencer of Preston
- 1706 Christopher Dauntesey of Agecroft

== Part of the Kingdom of Great Britain ==
=== House of Stuart, restoration ===
- 1707 Edmund Cole of Beaumont Cote, Lancaster
- 1708 Myles Sandys of Graythwaite Hall, Furness
- 1709 Roger Kirkby (died Feb 1709) of Kirby-Ireleth, Furness then Alexander Hesketh
- 1710 Robert Parker of Cuerden Hall
- 1711 Sir Thomas Standish of Duxbury Hall
- 1712 William Rawstorne of Edenfield and Penwortham
- 1713 Richard Valentine of Eccles
- 1714 William Farington of Leyland

=== House of Hanover ===
- 1715 Jonathan Blackburne of Orford Hall, Warrington
- 1716 Thomas Crisp of Parbold, nr. Wigan
- 1717 Samuel Crooke of the Old Crook, Leyland
- 1718 Richard Norris of Speke Hall
- 1719 Thomas Stanley of Clitheroe
- 1720 Robert Mawdesley of Mawdesley, Near Ormskirk
- 1721 Benjamin Hoghton of Hoghton Tower
- 1722 Benjamin Gregge of Chamber Hall, near Oldham
- 1723 Sir Edward Stanley of Bickerstaffe, near Ormskirk
- 1724 William Tatham of Ireby, near Kirkby Lonsdale
- 1725 Miles Sandy of Graythwaite Hall, Hawkeshead
- 1726 Edmund Hopwood of Hopwood Hall, Middleton
- 1727 Daniel Wilson of Dalham Tower, near Milnthorpe
- 1728 Joseph Yates of Stanley House, Manchester
- 1729 William Greenhaigh of Myerscough, near Preston
- 1730 James Chetham of Smedley
- 1731 William Leigh of Westhoughton
- 1732 John Parker of Breightmet, near Bolton
- 1733 John Greaves of Culcheth, near Leigh
- 1734 William Bushell of Preston
- 1735 Arthur Hamilton of Liverpool
- 1736 Sir James Darcy Lever of Alkrington Hall, Manchester
- 1737 Thomas Horton of Chadderton Hall
- 1738 Samuel Chetham of Turton Tower and Castleton
- 1739 Sir Ralph Assheton of Middleton
- 1740 Roger Hesketh of North Meols, Southport
- 1741 Robert Dukinfield of Manchester
- 1742 Robert Bankes of Winstanley Hall, near Wigan
- 1743 John Blackburne of Orford Hall, Warrington
- 1744 Robert Radclyffe of Foxdenton Hall, Chadderton
- 1745 Daniel Willis of Prescot
- 1746 William Shawe of Preston
- 1747 Samuel Birch of Ardwick (father of Samuel Birch (military officer))
- 1748 George Clarke of Hyde Hall, Manchester
- 1749 Rigby Molyneux of Preston
- 1750 Charles Stanley of Ormskirk
- 1751 James Fenton of Lancaster
- 1752 Richard Townley of Belfield Hall, Butterworth, Rochdale
- 1753 John Bradshaw of Manchester
- 1754 Thomas Hesketh of Rufford Old Hall
- 1755 Thomas Johnson of Manchester
- 1756 James Barton of Penwortham, Preston
- 1757 James Bayley of Withington, Manchester
- 1758 Robert Gibson of Myerscough
- 1759 Richard Whitehead of Claughton, near Preston
- 1760 Samuel Hilton of Pennington, Leigh
- 1761 Sir William Farington of Shaw Hall, Leyland
- 1762 Thomas Braddyll of Conishead, Ulverston
- 1763 Thomas Blackburne of Hale and Orford Hall, Warrington
- 1764 Sir William Horton, 1st Baronet of Chadderton
- 1765 John Walmesley of Wigan
- 1766 Edward Gregge of Oldham
- 1767 Alexander Butler of Kirkland Hall
- 1768 Thomas Butterworth Bayley of Pendleton
- 1769 Dorning Rasbotham of Farnworth
- 1770 Nicholas Ashton of Liverpool
- 1771 Sir Ashton Lever of Alkrington Hall Middleton
- 1772 William Cunliffe Shawe of Singleton Lodge, Preston
- 1773 Thomas Patten of Bank Hall, Warrington
- 1774 Geoffrey Hornby of Preston
- 1775 Sir Watts Horton, 2nd Baronet of Chadderton Hall
- 1776 Lawrence Rawsthorne of Edenfield
- 1777 Samuel Clowes of Chorlton
- 1778 Wilson Gale-Braddyll of Conishead
- 1779 John Clayton of Carr Hall, Little Harwood
- 1780 John Atherton of Walton Hall, Liverpool
- 1781 John Blackburne of Orford Hall, Warrington
- 1782 Sir Frank Standish of Duxbury Hall
- 1783 James Whalley, later Sir James Whalley-Smythe-Gardiner, 2nd Baronet of Whalley
- 1784 William Bankes of Wigan
- 1785 John Sparling of Liverpool
- 1786 Sir John Parker Mosley, 1st Baronet of Ancoats
- 1787 William Bamford of Bury
- 1788 Edward Falkner of Liverpool
- 1789 William Hulton of Hulton Park, near Bolton
- 1790 Charles Gibson of Lancaster
- 1791 James Starky of Heywood, Lancashire
- 1792 William Assheton of Preston and Clitheroe
- 1793 Thomas Townley Parker of Preston
- 1794 Henry Philip Hoghton of Hoghton Tower and Walton
- 1795 Robinson Shuttleworth of Preston
- 1796 Richard Gwillym of Warrington
- 1797 Bold Fleetwood Hesketh of Southport
- 1798 John Entwistle of Rochdale
- 1799 Joseph Starkie of Oldham
- 1800 James Ackers of Liverpool

== Part of the United Kingdom ==
=== House of Hanover ===
- 1801 Sir Thomas Dalrymple Hesketh of Rufford New Hall
- 1802 Robert Gregge Hopwood of Middleton
- 1803 Isaac Blackburne of Orford
- 1804 Thomas Lister Parker of Clitheroe
- 1805 Meyrick Holme Bankes of Wigan
- 12 February 1806: Le Gendre Piers Starkie, of Huntroyde Hall
- 1807 Richard Crosse Legh of Shaw Hill, near Chorley
- 1808 Thomas Clayton of Carr Hill, Little Harwood
- 6 February 1809: Samuel Clowes, of Broughton Hall
- 1810 William Hulton of Hulton Park; instigator of the Peterloo massacre
- 14 February 1811: Samuel Chetham Hilton, of Moston Hall
- 1812 Edward Greaves of Culcheth, near Leigh
- 1813 William Farington of Shaw Hall, Leyland
- 12 February 1814: Lawrence Rawstorne, of Penwortham Hall
- 13 February 1815: Le Gendre Starkie, of Huntroyde Hall
- 1816 William Townley of Townhead, near Ulverston
- 1817 Robert Townley Parker of Preston (son of Thomas Townley, HS 1893)
- 1818 Joseph Feilden of Witton House, near Blackburn
- 1819 John Walmesley of Castle Mere, Rochdale
- 1820 Robert Hesketh of Rossall Hall, Fleetwood
- 1821 Thomas Richmond Gale Braddyll of Conishead Priory, Ulverston
- 1822 James Shuttleworth of Barton, near Preston
- 1823 Thomas Greene of Slyne, near Lancaster and Whittington Hall
- 1824 John Entwistle of Foxholes, near Rochdale
- 1825 John Hargreaves, of Ormerod House, Burnley
- 1826 James Penny Machell of Penny Bridge, over-Sands
- 1827 Charles Gibson of Quernmore Park, Lancaster
- 1828 Edmund Hornby of Dalton Hall, Burton, Westmorland
- 1829 Henry Bold Hoghton of Hoghton Tower
- 1830 Peter Hesketh, of Rossall Hall, Fleetwood; landowner, developer
- 1831 Peregrine Edward Towneley, of Towneley
- 1832 George Richard Marton, of Capernwray Hall
- 1833 Sir John Gerard, 12th Baronet, of Garswood and New Hall
- 1834 Thomas Joseph Trafford, of Trafford Park; (one of the first Roman Catholics appointed to public office after the repeal of the Test Acts)
- 1835 Thomas Clifton, of Lytham Hall
- 1836 Charles Standish, of Standish Hall
- 1837 Thomas Bright Crosse, of Shaw Hill, near Chorley
- 1838 William Blundell, of Crosby Hall
- 1839 Charles Scarisbrick, of Scarisbrick
- 1840 Thomas Fitzherbert Brockholes of Claughton Hall, near Preston
- 1841 Sir Thomas Bernard Birch of Liverpool
- 1842 Thomas Robert Wilson France of Rawcliffe Hall
- 1843 William Garnett of Lancaster and Salford
- 1844 John Fowden Hindle of Woodfold Park, near Blackburn
- 1845 Pudsey Dawson the younger, of Hornby Castle
- 1846 William Standish Standish, of Duxbury Hall
- 1847 William Gale, of Lightburne House, Ulverstone
- 1848 Thomas George Hesketh of Rufford New Hall
- 1849 John Smith Entwistle of Foxholes, Rochdale
- 1850 Clement Royds, of Mount Falinge, Rochdale
- 1851 Thomas Percival Heywood of Pendleton
- 1852 Thomas Weld-Blundell of Ince Blundell, near Liverpool
- 1853 John Talbot Clifton of Lytham Hall
- 1854 Richard Fort of Read Hall, Clitheroe
- 1855 John Pemberton Heywood of Liverpool
- 1856 Robert Needham Philips of Prestwich
- 1857 Charles Towneley of Burnley
- 1858 George Marton, of Capernwray Hall
- 1859 Sir Robert Tolver Gerard of Ashton in Makerfield
- 1860 Henry Garnett of Wyreside, Lancaster
- 1861 Sir Humphrey de Trafford of Manchester
- 1862 William Allen Francis Saunders of Wennington Hall, near Lancaster
- 1863 Sir William Brown, Bt of Liverpool; politician and philanthropist
- 1864 Sir James Phillips Kay-Shuttleworth of Gawthorpe Hall
- 1865 William Preston of Ellel Grange, near Lancaster
- 1866 Sir Elkanah Armitage of Manchester
- 1867 Thomas Dicconson of Wigan
- 1868 Le Gendre Nicholas Starkie of Huntroyde Hall
- 1869 Benjamin Heywood Jones
- 1870 Henry F. Rigge of Wood Broughton, Grange-over-Sands
- 1871 Sir James Watts of Cheadle
- 1872 Thomas Wrigley of Bury
- 1873 Sir James Ramsden of Barrow-in-Furness
- 1874 Richard Smethurst of Chorley
- 1875 John Pearson of Newton-le-Willows
- 1876 Oliver Ormerod Walker of Bury
- 1877 George Blucher Heneage Marton of Capernwray Hall
- 1878 Nathaniel Eckersley of Standish Hall, Wigan
- 1879 William Garnett of Quernmore Park, Lancaster
- 1880 Ralph John Aspinall of Clitheroe
- 1881 William Foster of Hornby Castle
- 1882 George McCorquodale of Newton-le-Willows
- 1883 Thomas Ashton of Ford Bank, Didsbury
- 1884 Thomas Brooks of Crawshaw Hall
- 1885 James Williamson of Lancaster; politician
- 1886 Sir Andrew Barclay Walker of Gateacre, near Liverpool
- 1887 Sir John Thursby of Burnley
- 1888 Oliver Heywood of Claremont, Manchester
- 1889 Clement Molyneux Royds of Greehill, Rochdale – twice member of Parliament for the Borough
- 1890 Charles Henry Bird of Cockerham
- 1891 George Theophilus Robert Preston replaced by Colonel William Foster of Hornby Castle
- 1892 John Knowles of Pendlebury
- 1893 Sir Thomas Storey of Lancaster; farmer and landowner
- 1894 Joshua W. Radcliffe of Oldham
- 1895 Frank Hardcastle of Bolton
- 1896 Sir Peter Carlew Walker of Liverpool
- 1897 Samuel Radcliffe Platt of Oldham
- 1898 William Balle Huntington of Darwen
- 1899 William Charles Jones of Bold, Warrington
- 1900 Frederick Baynes of Samlesbury Hall, near Preston

=== House of Saxe-Coburg-Gotha ===
- 1901 Charles Hesketh Bibby-Hesketh, of the Rockery, North Meols, Southport (later Charles Hesketh Fleetwood-Hesketh)
- 1902 Arthur Knowles, of Westwood, Pendlebury, and of Alvaston Hall, Nantwich
- 1903 Henry Whitehead of Bury
- 1904 Herbert Lushington Storey of Lancaster
- 1905 Sir John Ormerod Scarlett Thursby of Burnley
- 1906 Edward Tootal Broadhurst of Congleton
- 1907 Sir William Henry Tate of Woolton
- 1908 Sir Thomas Brocklebank of Liverpool
- 1909 Sir William Bower Forwood of Bromborough
- 1910 Reginald Arthur Tatton of Preston
- 1911 Sir George Augustus Pilkington of Southport
- 1912 John Stone of Roby, Liverpool
- 1913 John William Makant of Bolton
- 1914 John Henry Maden of Rockcliffe House, Bacup
- 1915 Edward Graham Wood of Southport
- 1916 Percy John Hibbert of Hampsfield, Grange-over-Sands

=== House of Windsor ===
- 1917 Sir William Hesketh Lever of Rivington, Bolton; industrialist
- 1918 Col. George Hesketh of Bolton.
- 1919 Sir Ralph Cockayne Assheton, Bt, of Downham Hall, Clitheroe
- 1920 Edward Deakin of Linwood, Astley Bridge, Bolton
- 1921 George Hildyard Bankes of Winstanley Hall, Wigan
- 1922 Myles Kennedy of Stone Cross, Ulverston
- 1923 Sir Benjamin Sands Johnson of Abbot's Lea, Woolton, Liverpool
- 1924 Arthur Moore Lamb of Eskdale, Birkdale
- 1925 George Owen Sandys of Graythwaite Hall, Hawkshead
- 1926 John Percy Taylor of Woodside, Heaton, Bolton.
- 1927 Sir James Philip Reynolds, Bt, of Levens Hall, Westmorland
- 1928 Sir Arthur Meyrick Hollins of The Coppice, Ribbleton, Preston
- 1929 Charles Sydney Jones of Eastborne, Princes Park, Liverpool
- 1930 Samuel Turner of Bamford, Rochdale
- 1931 Sir Frederick Charles Bowring of Sefton Park, Liverpool
- 1932 Austin Townsend Porritt of Stubbins, near Bury
- 1933 Arthur Samuel Mitchell of West Didsbury, Manchester
- 1934 Sir Thomas Edward Higham of Bank House, Accrington
- 1935 Myles Noel Kenyon of Bury
- 1936 Thomas Stone of Roby
- 1937 William James Garnett of Quernmore Park, Lancaster
- 1938 Charles Eastwood of Moss House, Leyland
- 1939 Colonel Alan Cecil Tod of Maryton Grange, Allerton, Liverpool
- 1940 Edmund Barwick Clegg of Shore, Littleborough
- 1941 William James Garnett of Quernmore Park, Lancaster
- 1942 Francis Joseph Weld of Weld Road, Birkdale
- 1943 Sir William Fawell Ascroft of Preston
- 1944 Edwin Thompson, of Fulwood Park, Liverpool
- 1945 Colonel Sir Henry Darlington of Melling Hall, Carnforth
- 1946 Sir Percy Macdonald of Manchester
- 1947 Lt.-Col. Roger Fleetwood of Meols Hall, Southport
- 1948 Sir Robert Rankin, 1st Baronet of Broughton Tower, Broughton in Furness
- 1949 Col. Wilfred Hugh Burton Rowley Kennedy
- 1950 Sir Harold Parkinson, of Burnley and Hornby Castle, nr Lancaster
- 1951 Francis Grundy of Prestwich, nr Manchester
- 1952 Col. Sir John Reynolds, of Liverpool
- 1953 Maj. Mervyn Sandys of Graythwaite Hall, nr Ulverston
- 1954 Col. Leonard Green of The Manor House, Whalley
- 1955 Sir Cuthbert Barwick Clegg of Higher Shore House, Littleborough; industrialist, chairman of the Cotton Spinners' and Manufacturers' Association.
- 1956 Col. Vere Egerton Cotton of Langdale, Grassendale Park, Liverpool
- 1957 Alan Storey of Lancaster
- 1958 Col. Robert Goulbourne Parker of Browsholme, Clitheroe
- 1959 Eric A Carpenter of Manchester
- 1960 Charles Peter Fleetwood Hesketh of Manor House, Hale
- 1961 Col. Walter M Musgrave-Hoyle of Caton, Lancaster
- 1962 Col. Geoffrey George Hargreaves Bolton of Littlemoor House, Clitheroe
- 1963 Sir Frank Lord of Werneth, Oldham
- 1964 Brigadier Philip John Denton Toosey of Liverpool
- 1965 Lt. Col. Henry Cary Owtram of Newland Hall, Lancaster
- 1966 Col. Frederick William Jones of Lytham
- 1967 Col. Robert Ward Greenhaigh of Bolton
- 1968 Albert Wild of Preston
- 1969 Brigadier Sir Douglas Inglis Crawford of Fernlea, Mossey Hill
- 1970 Col. Henry John Darlington of Halton, nr Lancaster
- 1971 Simon Towneley of Dyneley
- 1972 Lt. Col. Joshua Geoffrey Barber-Lomax of Turton
- 1973 Henry Lumby of Ormskirk
- 1974 Col. Denis Arthur Sydenham Houghton of Broughton, Preston
- 1975 Maj. Basil Greenwood of Whalley
- 1976 Geoffrey Price Bowring of Halton Park; farmer and landowner
- 1977 Maj. Stanley Ryde Riddiough of Colne
- 1978 Col. Michael Albert Astley Birtwistle of Tunstall
- 1979 Cyril Joseph Ainscough of Parbold
- 1980 David Israel Goldstone replaced by Edward Anthony Nickson of Lytham
- 1981 Sidney Roy Fisher of Whittle-le-Woods
- 1982 Alexander Fordyce of Feniscowles
- 1983 Leonard Broughton of Blackpool
- 1984 Peter John James Wren of Whittle-le-Woods
- 1985 Edmund Christopher Parker of Browsholme, Clitheroe
- 1986 Edward Chambre Dickson of Goosnargh, Preston
- 1987 Robert Priestley Shepherd of Rossendale
- 1988 John Frederick Greenhough of Lytham
- 1989 Charles Joseph Weld-Blundell
- 1990 Patrick William Townsend of Gisburn
- 1991 John Renshaw Holt of Tatham
- 1992 Keith Ainsworth Gledhill of Marton
- 1993 Robert Rainey Craik of Mawdesley
- 1994 Judith Josa Duckworth of Bleasdale
- 1995 Ralph William Goodall of Hoghton
- 1996 Timothy Roy Henry Kimber of Newton Hall
- 1997 Sir David Austin Trippier of Dowry Head, Helmshore
- 1998 Charles Anthony Beresford Brennan of Hoghton
- 1999 Lady Shuttleworth of Leck
- 2000 Rodney Newman Swarbrick of Longridge
- 2001 Gloria Oates
- 2002 Thomas Geoffrey Bowring of Halton, Lancaster
- 2003 Bryan Mark Gray
- 2004 Gail Simpson Stanley
- 2005 James Christopher Armfield
- 2006 Peter Robinson
- 2007 Ruth Roderick Winterbottom of Caton, nr Lancaster
- 2008 Colonel Ewart Alan Jolley
- 2009 Caroline Susan Reynolds of Carnforth
- 2010 Dennis George Mendoros of Foulridge
- 2011 Peter Mileham
- 2012 Michael Jeremy Gorick of Fulwood, Preston
- 2013: Letitia Ann Dean
- 2014: Dr Barry Johnson of Preston
- 2015: Amanda Parker of Browsholme Hall, Clitheroe
- 2016: John Morris Barnett, of Blackpool
- 2017: Robert Mitchel Webb, of Arkholme
- 2018: Anthony John William Attard, of Preston
- 2019: Ralph Christopher Assheton of Clitheroe
- 2020: Catherine Penny of Dutton Hall, Ribchester
- 2021: Edwin John Booth Osbaldeston
- 2022: Martin John Ainscough of Parbold Hall
- 2023: David Taylor
- 2024: Helen Bingley
- 2025: James Carter
- 2026: David Collinge of Dutton
