= Edmund Trafford =

Edmund Trafford may refer to:

- Edmund Trafford (1526–1590), MP for Lancashire
- Edmund Trafford (died 1620), MP for Newton
