= John Atherton (disambiguation) =

John Atherton (1598–1640) was an Anglican bishop.

John Atherton may also refer to:

- John Atherton (died 1573) (c. 1513–1573), MP for Lancashire in 1559
- John Atherton (died 1617) (c. 1557–1617), MP for Lancashire in 1586 and Lancaster in 1589
- John Atherton (pioneer) (1837–1913), English explorer of Queensland, Australia
- John Carlton Atherton (1900–1952), American artist
- John McDougal Atherton (1841–1932), American businessman, property developer and politician
- John W. Atherton (1916–2001), founding president of Pitzer College
