= Myles N. Kenyon Cup =

The Myles N. Kenyon Cup, popularly known as the Kenyon Cup was an amateur football cup competition held for teams playing in Amateur Leagues in and around Bury, England and is named after former Lancashire captain and batsman and High Sheriff of Lancashire, Myles Noel Kenyon. It was formed in 1922 and the last game was played in 2017.

== History ==
The first recorded Kenyon Cup competition took place in 1922 taking its constituent teams from the four local leagues:

- The Bury Amateur Football League
- The Bury Metro Alliance Amateur Football League
- The Radcliffe Amateur Football League
- The Bury & District Sunday Schools' Amateur Football League

Since its inception the competition has been runs as a benevolent fund for either players or match officials who have suffered financial hardship due to their involvement in football or for other causes. This can be shown amongst other things by the cup being run as a joint committee of the four original leagues and Bury Referees' Association. The full title was 'Bury and District Football Leagues' and Referees' Association Central Benevolent Fund.'

A review of the competition's financial records for 1958-59 showed that no fewer than 55 teams participated in the competition, each paying an entrance fee of 5 shillings. The Honorary Treasurer was Mr M V Wareing, the Honorary Secretary was Mr J B Howarth and the Auditor Mr F Turner. That year, the competition invested in a typewriter costing £16!

The cup continued as an annual competition from across the above leagues in the Bury area, until eventually only the Bury Amateur League remained.

Finally in 2004 the Bury Amateur League could no longer hold a full fixture list having only three clubs remaining, and so as the only remaining constituent league withdrew, the Myles N Kenyon Cup was likewise suspended. This meant that no Kenyon Cup games took place in the 2004-05 season.

== Relaunch ==
In 2005, the Management Committee, consisting of the Life Members, Officers, representatives of the Bury Referees' Association and other committee members relaunched the cup as a preseason competition and once again invited teams from a number of different leagues across Bury to join the cup.

Since the relaunch of the competition the cup continued as a preseason tournament with the final held each year on Bury's Gigg Lane. In earlier seasons' competition the semi-finals was held at a neutral venue (Ramsbottom United's Riverside Ground). In the second year of the new competition a group stage was added for the first round, with four groups of four, the top two teams progressing on to the quarter-final stages. From the relaunch of the competition, extra time was not played in any game of the knockout stages - if the score was level at full time, the result was determined by penalties.

== Demise ==
From 2005-06 to 2015-16, 16 teams participated each season - the only exceptions being the 2008-09 and 2014-15 seasons, which each had 15 teams. However, this dropped significantly to 8 teams for the 2016-17 season. It had also become increasingly difficult for the committee to recruit volunteers to serve as officers or committee members. As a result, the decision was taken in early 2017 that the competition would be permanently discontinued after the final Final tie on 24 April 2017.

After the final, and when all the finances had been settled, the Fund's monetary assets were disposed of. The Committee were keen to ensure that the Fund was used to benefit local amateur football, so the funds were distributed between the 8 remaining clubs, along with local leagues and referees' associations.

The final Fund Committee, in 2017, comprised:

- Chairman: A Salmon.
- Secretary: P Dugdale.
- Treasurer: A Walker.
- Referees' Secretary: M Collinge.
- Minutes Secretary: D Hanson.
- Bury Referees' Association representatives: D Barrett, P McKenna and P Thompson.
- Life Members: P Dugdale, D Edwards, P Fitzgerald, W Jones and A Walker.

== The Cups ==
The original Myles N. Kenyon Cup was stolen from the home of a club secretary in January 1999 and never recovered. It was described in a valuation undertaken in 1978 as "an 8 in hallmarked silver cup, with handles and scalloped top to bown of cup. It had a double riser plinth with two complete name bands. It was engraved, "Bury & District Football Leagues Benevolent Fund, The Myles N. Kenyon Cup." It weighed 25oz." A replacement cup was donated by the long-standing Competition Sponsors, Albany International Ltd.

In summer 2007, following the sad demise of the Bury Amateur League, the league donated their historic Spencer Cup to the Myles N. Kenyon Cup. It had first been used in 1895 by the Bury Sunday Schools' League, before passing to the Bury Amateur League following the demise of the Bury Sunday Schools' League. Following the demise of the Myles N. Kenyon Cup competition, the Spencer Cup was presented to the Mayor of Bury, Councillor Mike Connolly, for safekeeping by the Metropolitan Borough of Bury. This took place on Thursday 20 April 2017, when several committee members attended the Mayor's Parlour in Bury Town Hall. The committee hoped that this will safeguard this valuable part of Bury's football heritage.

The replacement Kenyon Cup (donated by Albany International) was presented to Walshaw, as the winners of the final competition. The Bill Lomax Runners-Up Shield was presented to Westbury.

In January 2011, the committee took delivery of a new Chairman's Chain of Office. The Chairman wore this at the Finals, when sponsors and guests were welcomed and the cups presented.

== Recent Finals ==
Note that while some teams are referred to as "A" or "B", this is not in reference to the clubs' 3rd or 4th teams as would generally be the case. Similar to how the Bury Amateur League used to document the teams, where a club has 2 teams entering the competition, the 1st team would be known as "A", and the reserves "B".

The Final on 3 May 2011 was attended by the Mayor of Bury, Cllr John Byrne. He was a former referee, including for the Myles N. Kenyon Cup.

The Final scheduled for 30 April 2014 was postponed, due to the field of play at Gigg Lane being waterlogged. It was rearranged and played on 2 May 2014.

The final Final on 24 April 2017 had an attendance of 191 via the turnstiles, plus guests. All proceeds from the Final were donated to the Mayor's Charities. The charities chosen by the Mayor, Cllr Mike Connolly, were Annabelle's Challenge, the Josh Wilson Brain Tumour Charity and Bury Alzheimer Society.

Season	Date & Venue	Teams	Result	Match Officials
2005-06	2 May 2006 Gigg Lane	Radcliffe Town v Tottington United 'A'	0-0; Radcliffe won on pens	Referee - P Thompson; Assistants - M Jason & B Talbot; 4th Official - M Jackson
2006-07	8 May 2007 Gigg Lane	Bury Grammar School Old Boys v Heywood St. James	0-3	Referee: N Greenhalgh; Assistants: D Abbott & P Adamson; 4th Official: D Hanson
2007-08	29 April 2008 Gigg Lane	Old Standians 'A' v Little Lever S.C. 'A'	1-1; Pens 4-5	Referee - P Adamson; Assistants: M Collinge & H Ali; 4th Official - K Greenhalgh
2008-09	27 April 2009 Gigg Lane	Little Lever SC 'A' v Stand Athletic 'B'	0-0 Stand won on pens	Referee: D Hanson; Assistants: P Heaps & N Wareham
2009-10	19 April 2010 Gigg Lane	Little Lever SC 'A' v AFC Bury 'A'	1-3	Referee: N Greenhalgh; Assistants: A Salmon & P Jones
2010-11	3 May 2011 Gigg Lane	Walshaw SC v Bury Amateur	1-1; Pens 4-5	Referee: D Watson; Assistants: C Parker & D McCarthy
2011-12	1 May 2012 Gigg Lane	AFC Bury v Heywood St James	1-2	Referee: V Evans; Assistants: C Brown & L Jacques; 4th Official: N Derby
2012-13	29 April 2013 Gigg Lane	AFC Bury 'A' v Walshaw SC 'B'	0-5	Referee: P Ince; Assistants: K Davies & M Collinge; 4th Official: A Sykes
2013-14	2 May 2014 Gigg Lane	Walshaw SC 'A' v Bolton County	2-1	Referee: M Sutcliffe; Assistants: S Howard & D Crompton; 4th Official: A Feber
2014-15	27 April 2015 Gigg Lane	Prestwich Heys v Walshaw SC 'A'	3-1	Referee: M Morledge; Assistants: Z Parris & P Whitehead; 4th Official: ?
2015-16	25 April 2016 Gigg Lane	Walshaw SC 'A' v Haslingden St Mary's	5-3	Referee: N Storey; Assistants :M Clarke & A Feber; 4th Official: ?
2016-17	24 April 2017 Gigg Lane	Walshaw SC v Westbury	2-2; Pens 4-3	Referee: D Watson; Assistants: P Ince & P Whitehead; 4th Official: ?
