= John Gresham (disambiguation) =

John Gresham is the name of:

- John Gresham (1495-1556), London merchant and mayor
- John Chowning Gresham, United States Army officer
- John Gresham (MP) for Newton, Horsham and New Windsor
- John Gresham, character in Aces High (film)

== See also ==
- John Gresham Machen
- John Grisham, writer and politician
