= John Gresham (MP) =

16th-century English politician

John Gresham (1529 – c. 1586), of Mayfield, Sussex, North End, near Fulham, Middlesex and Bishopsgate Street, London, was an English Member of Parliament. He represented New Windsor in 1563, Horsham in 1571 and Newton in 1572.

Parliament of England
Preceded by Thomas Weldon; Roger Amyce	Member of Parliament for New Windsor; 1563–1567; With: Richard Gallys	Succeeded by John Thomson; Humphrey Michell
Preceded by Peter Osborne; Robert Buxton	Member of Parliament for Horsham; 1571–1571; With: John Hussey	Succeeded by Nicholas Hare; John Hare
Preceded by Anthony Mildmay; Richard Stoneley	Member of Parliament for Newton; 1572–1572; With: John Savile	Succeeded by Robert Langton; Edward Savage
