= Miles Fleetwood =

English office-holder and politician

Sir Miles Fleetwood of Aldwinkle, Northamptonshire (died 8 March 1641) was an English office-holder and politician who sat in the House of Commons at various times between 1614 and 1641.

== Biography ==
Fleetwood was the son of Sir William Fleetwood (died after 1610) of Ealing and Cranford, Middlesex, who was receiver-general of the court of wards and liveries until he was sequestered from this office in 1609. Fleetwood was admitted to Gray's Inn on 9 January 1588. In 1602 he was knighted in Dublin by Lord Blount, the Lord Deputy of Ireland. In 1604 Fleetwood had been granted a reversion on the office of receiver-general of the court of wards and liveries on the death of his father, but because of the sequestration he obtained the position on 22 March 1610 which was before his father's death. Fleetwood made the office profitable enough that by 1618 he was lending money to the Crown.

In 1614 Fleetwood was elected Member of Parliament for Huntingdon, in 1621 for Westbury and in 1624 for Launceston. In 1625 and 1626 he was elected to represent Newton, Lancashire and in 1628 New Woodstock. In April 1640 he was elected as one of the members of parliament for Hindon in the Short Parliament and was re-elected in November 1640 for the Long Parliament. He held the seat until his death in 1641. His financial interests and those of King Charles I were thoroughly intertwined and he remained a strong supporter of the King throughout his life.

== Family ==
In 1599 Fleetwood married Anne, daughter of Nicholas Luke of Woodend, Bedfordshire. They had three notable sons, the eldest of whom was Sir William Fleetwood of Aldwinkle (b. 1603 – 1674), who succeeded to his father's estates and office, and supported the Royalist cause in the Civil War. George, the second son, sought his fortune in the service of Sweden. Charles, the parliamentary general, who appears to have been much younger than his brothers, was left by his father an annuity of £60, chargeable on the estate of Sir William Fleetwood. His daughter Dorothy married Sir Robert Cooke, MP for Gloucestershire.

== Notes ==
Parliament of England
Preceded by Henry Cromwell; Thomas Harley	Member of Parliament for Huntingdon; 1614; With: Sir Christopher Hatton	Succeeded by Sir Henry St John; Sir Miles Sandys, 1st Baronet
Preceded by Matthew Ley; Henry Ley	Member of Parliament for Westbury; 1621–1622; With: Sir James Ley	Succeeded by Sir John Saye; Henry Mildmay
Preceded by John Harris; Thomas Bond	Member of Parliament for Launceston; 1624; With: Sir Francis Crane	Succeeded by Sir Bevil Grenville; Richard Scott
Preceded by Thomas Charnock; Edmund Breres	Member of Parliament for Newton; 1625–1626; With: Sir Henry Edmonds	Succeeded by Sir Henry Holcroft; Sir Francis Onslow
Vacant Parliament suspended since 1629	Member of Parliament for Hindon; 1640–1641; With: George Garrett; Robert Reynolds	Succeeded by Robert Reynolds; Thomas Bennett
