= Thomas Bennett (MP for Hindon) =

Thomas Bennett (1620 – 1644) was an English politician who sat in the House of Commons from 1641 to 1644.

Bennett was the son of Thomas Bennett, of Pythouse, Wiltshire and his wife Meliora, daughter of Richard and Ann Thomas, of Sedgehill, Wiltshire. He matriculated at Hart Hall, Oxford on 13 October 1637 aged 17.

In 1641, Bennett was elected member of parliament for Hindon in the Long Parliament. He was disabled from sitting in 1644 and died in the same year.

Bennet had fourteen siblings, including John Bennet (1625–1677), MP for Shaftesbury 1667–1677, who was the father of Thomas Bennett, MP for Shaftesbury.

Parliament of England
Preceded by Robert Reynolds; Sir Miles Fleetwood	Member of Parliament for Hindon; 1641–1644; With: Robert Reynolds	Succeeded by Robert Reynolds
