= Dorning =

Dorning is both a surname and a given name. Notable people with the name include:

- Robert Dorning (1913–1989), English actor and musician
- Stacy Dorning (born 1958), English actress
- Dorning Rasbotham (c.1730 – 1791), English writer, antiquarian, artist and High Sheriff of Lancashire
