= Dudley Norton =

English official in the Kingdom of Ireland

Sir Dudley Norton (died 27 July 1634) was an English official who was Secretary of State of the Kingdom of Ireland.

== Biography ==
Norton was the son of John Norton of Wyarton, Kent and Johanna St Leger, niece of Sir Anthony St Leger.

In 1612, he was granted reversion of the office of the Principal Secretary of State and Chancellor of the Exchequer of Ireland in the Dublin Castle administration of James VI and I. On 19 January 1615, on account of the infirmities of Sir Richard Cooke, the king directed that Norton was to assume the role of Principal Secretary alongside Cooke. It was also directed that Norton would receive £200 per year and be appointed to the Privy Council of Ireland. On the death of Cooke in 1616, Norton became the senior Principal Secretary and Keeper of the Signet. Sir Francis Annesley became a secretary to assist Norton. Upon the death of James I, on 28 July 1625 Charles I of England directed Norton to continue in his office with an annuity of £200 and an allowance of £100 "for intelligence". On 13 March 1617, Henry Holcroft had been granted the reversion to Norton's position as chancellor. In 1622, Norton was a member of a commission into the Plantation of Leitrim.

Dudley died in 1634. He was buried in the choir of Christ Church Cathedral, Dublin on 30 July 1634. He had married Margaret Masterson, daughter of Sir Thomas Masterson; they had one son.

Political offices
Preceded by Sir Richard Cooke	Secretary of State (Ireland); 1612–1634	Succeeded by Francis Annesley
Preceded by Sir Richard Cooke	Chancellor of the Exchequer of Ireland; 1612–1617	Succeeded by Henry Holcroft
