= Thomas Charnock (MP) =

English politician

Thomas Charnock (1587–1648) was an English politician who sat in the House of Commons in 1624.

Charnock was the second son of Robert Charnock, of Charnock or Astley, Lancashire. He lived at Astley Hall, Chorley, Lancashire. In 1624, he was elected Member of Parliament for Newton in the Happy Parliament.

Charnock was elder brother of Roger Charnock who was MP for Newton in 1614.

Parliament of England
Preceded by Sir George Wright; Richard Kippax	Member of Parliament for Newton; 1624; With: Edmund Breres	Succeeded by Miles Fleetwood; Sir Henry Edmonds
