= Henry Edmonds =

English politician

Sir Henry Edmonds (1605–1635) was an English politician who sat in the House of Commons from 1625 to 1626.

Edmonds was the son of Sir Thomas Edmonds of the Privy Council and his first wife Magdalen Wood, daughter of Sir John Wood. He matriculated at Christ Church, Oxford on 16 December 1620, aged 15 and was awarded BA on 13 February 1623.

In 1625, Edmonds was elected Member of Parliament for Newton. He was knighted in February 1626. He was re-elected MP for Newton in 1626.

Edmonds is said to have died an "inveterate drunkard" at the age of about 30.

Parliament of England
Preceded by Thomas Charnock; Edmund Breres	Member of Parliament for Newton; 1625–1626; With: Miles Fleetwood	Succeeded by Sir Henry Holcroft; Sir Francis Onslow
