= Judith Josa Duckworth =

British government official (1933–2016)

Judith Josa Duckworth JP DL

Vice Lord-Lieutenant of Lancashire
- In office 2005–2008
- Monarch: Elizabeth II

High Sheriff of Lancashire
- In office 1994–1995
- Monarch: Elizabeth II
- Preceded by: Robert Rainey Craik
- Succeeded by: Ralph William Goodall

Personal details
- Born: Judith Josa Verdon; 1933 Liverpool, England
- Died: 2016 (aged 82–83) Kirkby Lonsdale, Cumbria, England
- Spouse: Peter Duckworth
- Children: 3
- Occupation: magistrate, philanthropist

Judith Josa Duckworth JP DL, also known as Judy Duckworth, (née Verdon; 1933 – 2016) was a British government officer and philanthropist. In 1994, she became the first woman to serve as High Sheriff of Lancashire, having been appointed by Elizabeth II. In 2005, she became the first woman to serve as Vice Lord-Lieutenant of Lancashire, having been appointed by Charles Kay-Shuttleworth, 5th Baron Shuttleworth. Duckworth also served as president of the Lune Valley chapter of the Royal National Lifeboat Institution and as Chairman of the Garstang chapter of the National Society for the Prevention of Cruelty to Children.

== Early life ==
Duckworth was born Judith Josa Verdon in Liverpool in 1933 to Frank and Beatrice Verdon.

== Public life ==
In 1973, she was appointed as a magistrate at Garstang, Fleetwood, and Lancaster, serving in that capacity for thirty years.

In 1994, she was appointed by Elizabeth II, as Duke of Lancaster, to serve as High Sheriff of Lancashire. Upon her appointment, she became the first woman to serve in this office. She was appointed as a Deputy Lieutenant by Lord Lieutenant Charles Kay-Shuttleworth, 5th Baron Shuttleworth and, in 2005, was appointed as Vice-Lord Lieutenant of Lancashire, serving in this capacity for three years. In 2006, Duckworth represented Lancashire at the Queen's 80th birthday service at St Paul's Cathedral in London. She also hosted royal visits to the county by the Princess Royal, the Duke of Kent, the Duke of Gloucester, and the Earl of Wessex.

In August 2007, Duckworth attended the Pride of Lancashire Awards Evening, where she presented an award, along with Chief Constable Steve Finnegan and High Sheriff Ruth Winterbottom, to Lancashire police constables Kazim Garda and Michael Woods for rescuing Roberta Clarke from a fire.

Duckworth also served as president of the Lune Valley chapter of the Royal National Lifeboat Institution and as Chairman of the Garstang chapter of the National Society for the Prevention of Cruelty to Children.

== Personal life and death ==
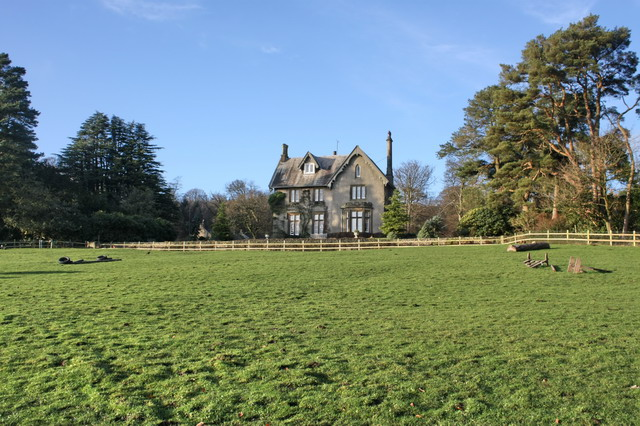
Bleasdale Tower, the 18th-century mansion in Bleasdale where Duckworth and her family lived.

In 1959, she married Peter Duckworth, with whom she had three children. She and her husband lived in Arkholme, Bleasdale, and Sedbergh before retiring to Kirkby Lonsdale.

Duckworth died in 2016. Lord Shuttleworth, the Lord Lieutenant of Lancashire, made a statement after her death, saying, "Through all the grand events and people, Judy never forgot the human side of it all, her interest in others and the importance of her family." A Catholic funeral was held on 13 December 2016 at St Peter's Church, Stonyhurst.
