= Roger Charnock =

Roger Charnock (1588 – 1645) was an English politician who sat in the House of Commons in 1614.

Charnock was the second son of Robert Charnock, of Charnock or Astley, Lancashire. He was admitted to Gray's Inn on 2 February 1608. In 1614, he was elected Member of Parliament for Newton in the Addled Parliament.

Charnock was the brother of Thomas Charnock who was MP for Newton in 1624.

Parliament of England
Preceded by Sir John Luke; Richard Ashton	Member of Parliament for Newton; 1614; With: William Ashton	Succeeded by Sir George Wright; Richard Kippax
