= John Luke (English politician) =

English politician

Sir John Luke (c. 1563 – 1638) was an English politician who sat in the House of Commons from 1610 to 1611.

Luke was the son of John Luke, of Woodend, Bedfordshire. He was knighted at Charterhouse on 11 May 1603. He was elected Member of Parliament for Newton in 1604.

Luke was the uncle of Sir Oliver Luke, the Parliamentary leader and MP for Bedfordshire in the Long Parliament.

Parliament of England
Preceded by Richard Ashton; Thomas Langton	Member of Parliament for Newton; 1604–1611; With: Richard Ashton	Succeeded by William Ashton; Roger Charnock
Preceded by Sir Thomas Richardson; Henry Meautys	Member of Parliament for St Albans; 1624–1625; With: Sir Arthur Capell (1624–1625); Sir Charles Morrison, Bt (1625)	Succeeded by Sir Charles Morrison, Bt; Sir Edward Goring
