= Henry Holcroft =

English politician

Sir Henry Holcroft (1586–1650) was an English politician who sat in the House of Commons between 1624 and 1629 and held appointments in the Dublin Castle administration in Ireland. He translated the History of the Wars of Justinian by Procopius of Caesarea from the Greek, which was published in 1653 in London (after his death) and became the standard edition.

== Biography ==
Holcroft was (according to the Essex Visitation of 1634) the son of Thomas Holcroft of Battersea, Surrey, and Joan, daughter and heir of Henry Roydon (also of Battersea), and grandson of Jeffrey Holcroft of The Hurst, Lancashire. In 1592 his mother remarried, to Sir Oliver St John. Holcroft therefore lived much of his life as the stepson of Viscount Grandison, who died in 1630: his mother survived, but died in March 1631. Her portrait bust in white marble is featured in the Grandison monument, commissioned by Sir Oliver, in St Mary's Church, Battersea. Henry matriculated Fellow-commoner from St John's College, Cambridge in about 1601, and was admitted to Lincoln's Inn in 1604.

On 30 August 1616, he was appointed Chief Secretary for Ireland under Sir Oliver St John in his capacity as Lord Deputy of Ireland. On 13 March 1617 he was made Chancellor of the Exchequer of Ireland. He acquired property in County Limerick and County Kerry by engaging in the common official practice of speculating in the discovery of concealed lands. By 1620, he was married (as her third husband) to Lettice Aungier, daughter of Francis Aungier, Master of the Rolls in Ireland, who in 1621 was created 1st Baron Aungier of Longford. They had five sons and four daughters. Holcroft was knighted at Whitehall on 1 May 1622 and took office twelve days later as the King's Secretary for Irish business.

The influence of Holcroft's ally, George Villiers, 1st Duke of Buckingham, ensured that he retained the role after the accession of Charles I of England in 1625. In 1624, he was elected Member of Parliament for Stockbridge. He was elected MP for Newton in 1628 and sat until 1629 when King Charles decided to rule without parliament for eleven years. He played an active role in the preparation of the royal concessions that were negotiated in the early months of 1628 with representatives of the settler communities in Ireland, in return for a substantial contribution to the costs of defending Ireland.

After the assassination of Buckingham, Holcroft served as a member of a new committee for dealing with Irish petitions and grievances. He engaged in various trading ventures, including an investment of £500 in the East India Company's 1629 voyage.

In 1634, he retired from duties in London and Dublin and became a justice of the peace in Essex, where he owned land at Greenstreet House, East Ham. During the English Civil War he was a supporter of Parliament and was a member of John Pym's council of war in 1643. In 1649–50 he became a parliamentary trustee for the disposal of the crown lands. Holcroft made his will and died in London at the age of about 64: among his possessions at that time were eight volumes of the works of St John Chrysostom.

=== Translation of Procopius ===
In 1653 (three years after his death) was published that useful literary work, his English-language translation from the ancient Greek (Ὑπὲρ τῶν Πολέμων Λόγοι) of Procopius of Caesarea's History of the Warres of the Emperour Justinian, with the Persians, Vandalls and Goths, in VIII Bookes. This was printed in London by Humphrey Moseley and became the standard English edition for many years thereafter. A description of the engraved frontispiece is given by Hind. According to the Preface to this work, Holcroft made use of the Greek edition of David Hœschelius, published in Augsburg in 1607, which had been based principally upon a manuscript in the library of the Duke of Bavaria compared with two others furnished by Joseph Scaliger and Isaac Casaubon. Holcroft, who also translated the Secret Histories (Ἀπόκρυφη Ἱστορία) of Procopius, gave sense for sense rather than a pedantically verbal rendering, and supplied lacunae from the Latin editions: the final corrections and edits were in the hands of Edmund Chilmead, to whom Holcroft had formerly exhibited.

Holcroft was brother-in-law of Gerald Aungier, 2nd Baron Aungier of Longford (c. 1594-1655), of East Clandon, Surrey, whose accomplishment in antique languages was highly commended by his kinsman and tutor, William Oughtred.

== Family ==
Sir Henry Holcroft and his wife the Hon. Lettice (Aungier) had five sons named in their father's will:

- St John Holcroft, eldest son, heir, born in Dublin c. 1620. Schooled at Battersea, Eton and Bishop's Stortford, he matriculated from Christ's College, Cambridge in 1636 and was admitted to Lincoln's Inn in 1638. He married Elizabeth, daughter of Sir Richard Higham of East Ham.
- Henry Holcroft, born in Dublin c. 1620, inherited his father's volumes of St John Chrysostom. Educated at Bishop's Stortford school, he matriculated from Christ's College, Cambridge in 1638, where he graduated BA in 1641-42 and MA in 1645, becoming a Fellow of Clare College, Cambridge 1645-1650. He was rector of Cliffe-at-Hoo, Kent, from 1652 to 1662, and rector of Patcham, Sussex, from 1662 until his death in 1712 aged 92. He was buried at Patcham.
- Charles Holcroft, living 1649
- Gerald Holcroft, living 1649
- Francis Holcroft, was admitted pensioner at Clare College, Cambridge in 1647. He graduated BA in 1650 and MA in 1654, and was a Fellow there, 1651-1660, when he was ejected: he was vicar of Bassingbourne, Cambridgeshire in 1655. An independent preacher, he was imprisoned in Cambridge Castle from 1663 to 1672, and at another time in the Fleet prison in London. He died in January 1692-93 and was buried in the Dissenters' churchyard at Triplow, Cambridgeshire, though his monumental inscription is in the church of Oakington.

and daughters:

- Elizabeth Holcroft, living 1649
- Lettice Holcroft, living 1649
- Douglas Holcroft (named for her maternal grandmother Douglas FitzGerald), living 1649

and also:

- Anne Holcroft (in Essex Visitation 1634)

Dame Lettice Holcroft survived her husband and was his executor.

Parliament of England
Preceded by Sir Henry Wallop; Sir William Ayloffe, Bt	Member of Parliament for Stockbridge; 1624; With: Sir Richard Gifford	Succeeded by Sir Richard Gifford; Sir Thomas Badger
Preceded by Miles Fleetwood; Sir Henry Edmonds	Member of Parliament for Newton; 1628–1629; With: Francis Onslow	Parliament suspended until 1640
Political offices
Preceded by Henry Piers	Chief Secretary for Ireland; 1616–1622	Vacant Title next held by George Lane
Preceded by Sir Dudley Norton	Chancellor of the Exchequer of Ireland; 1616–1617	Succeeded by Thomas Hibbotts
