= Edmund Breres =

English politician

Edmund Breres (1580 - 1625) was an English politician who sat in the House of Commons in 1624.

Breres was the son of Alexander Breres of Chorley or Preston in Amounderness. He was admitted at Gray's Inn on 25 November 1602. In 1624, he was elected Member of Parliament for Newton for the Happy Parliament.

Breres married a daughter of Thomas Tyldesley, of Tyldesley, the Attorney-General of Lancashire.

Parliament of England
Preceded by Sir George Wright; Richard Kippax	Member of Parliament for Newton; 1624; With: Thomas Charnock	Succeeded by Miles Fleetwood; Sir Henry Edmonds
