= Myles Kenyon =

English cricketer

Personal information
- Full name: Myles Noel Kenyon
- Born: 25 December 1886; Bury, Greater Manchester, England
- Died: 21 November 1960 (aged 73); Birdham, Sussex, England
- Batting: Right-handed

Domestic team information
- Years: Team
- 1919 to 1925: Lancashire

Career statistics
| Competition | First-class |
|---|---|
| Matches | 91 |
| Runs scored | 1435 |
| Batting average | 14.79 |
| 100s/50s | 0/5 |
| Top score | 61 not out |
| Balls bowled | – |
| Wickets | – |
| Bowling average | – |
| 5 wickets in innings | – |
| 10 wickets in match | – |
| Best bowling | – |
| Catches/stumpings | 20/0 |
- Source: Cricket Archive, 23 September 2014

Myles Noel Kenyon (25 December 1886 – 21 November 1960) was an English cricketer.

He was born at Walshaw Hall, Bury, Greater Manchester, the son of James Kenyon, a prosperous woollen and cotton manufacturer and Conservative MP; and Elise / Elisa Augusta (née Genth) Kenyon, a classically trained musician baptised in Rusholme with German parents; and educated at Eton School.

He played cricket as a right-handed batsman for Lancashire and was club captain from 1919 to 1922. He was club president in 1936–37. In 1934 he served as High Sheriff of Lancashire. He was also a Deputy Lieutenant for the county.

He died 21 November 1960 in Birdham, Sussex aged 73. In 1909 he had married Mary Moon.

The Myles N. Kenyon Cup was competed for by amateur football teams in the Bury area, until its demise in 2017.
