= Robert Hesketh =

English politician

- Born: c. 22 September 1569
- Died: 7 November 1620

Robert Hesketh (c. 22 September 1569 – 7 November 1620) was an English MP and High Sheriff.

He was born at Whalley, Lancashire, the eldest son of Sir Thomas Hesketh of Rufford and Great Harwood, Lancashire of the old and well-known Lancashire Hesketh family. He succeeded his father in 1588, inheriting Martholme, the medieval Manor House near Great Harwood, as well as other property at Rufford, Holmes and Holmeswood. He was a maternal cousin of Sir Gilbert Gerard.

He was appointed a justice of the peace c.1592 and High Sheriff of Lancashire for 1599–1600. He was elected knight of the shire (MP) for Lancashire in 1597.

He died in 1620 and was buried in Rufford chapel. He had married three times: firstly Mary, the daughter of Sir George Stanley of Crosse Hall, and with whom he had four sons; secondly Blanche, the daughter and coheiress of Henry Twiford of Kenwick, Shropshire and widow of William Stopford; thirdly Jane, the daughter of Thomas Spencer of Rufford, with whom he had one son. He bequeathed his Martholme property to his third wife, who later married Sir Richard de Hoghton.

== Issue ==
=== With Mary ===
- John Hesketh
- Mary Hesketh (m. Thomas Stanley)
  - Jane Stanley
  - Elizabeth Stanley (d. 1655)
  - Mary Stanley
  - Richard Stanley (d. 1640)
  - Bridget Stanley
- Thomas Hesketh (b. 1572, m. Susan Powes)
- Holcroft Hesketh (m. Roger Dodsworth)
- Robert Hesketh (m. Margaret Standish)
  - Robert Hesketh (d. 1651)
- Henry Hesketh
- George Hesketh (m. Jane Sherbourne)
- Jane Hesketh (m. William Reynolds)

=== With Jane ===
- Robert Hesketh
