= Speke Hall =

Grade I listed Tudor manor house in Speke, Merseyside, England

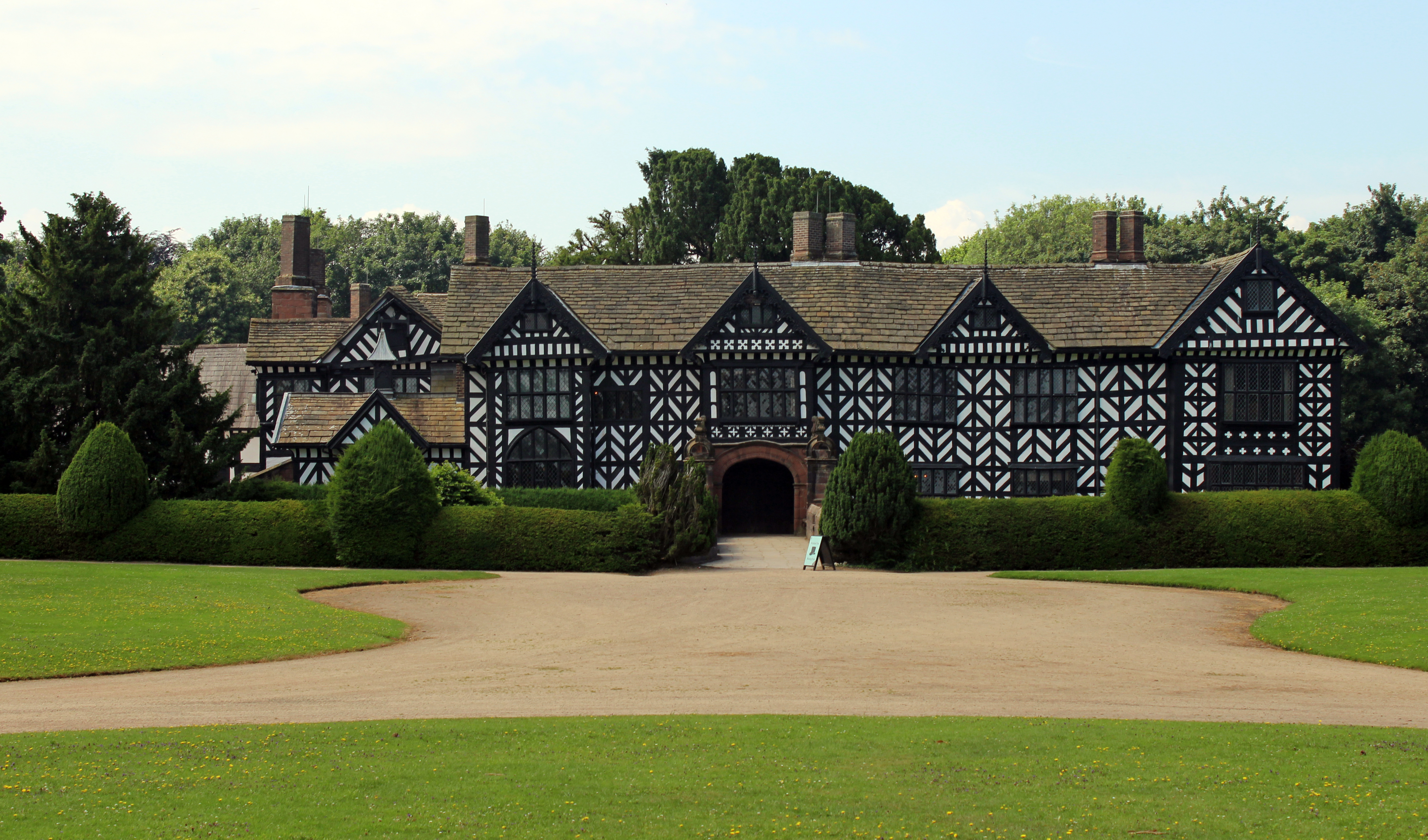
- North front of Speke Hall

- Location within Merseyside
- 53°20′12″N 2°52′27″W
- Type: Manor House
- Location: Speke
- OS grid reference: SJ 41865 82568

History
- Built: 1530–1598

Site notes
- Area: Liverpool
- Architectural style: Tudor
- Owner: National Trust

Listed Building – Grade I
- Official name: Speke Hall
- Designated: 28 June 1952
- Reference no.: 1359837

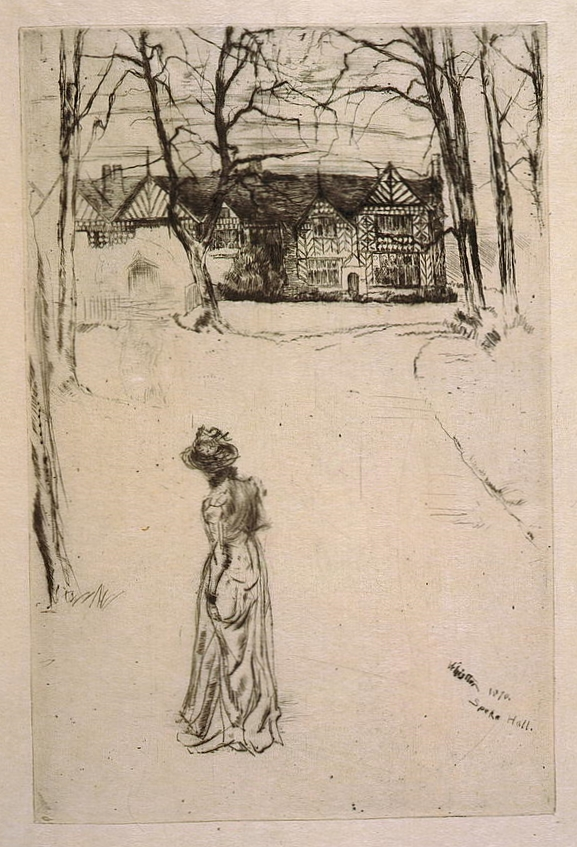
Speke Hall by James Abbott McNeill Whistler (1870).

Speke Hall is a wood-framed wattle-and-daub Tudor manor house in Speke, Liverpool, England. It is one of the finest surviving examples of its kind. It is owned by the National Trust and is a Grade I listed building.

== History ==
Construction of the current building began under Sir William Norris in 1530, though earlier buildings had been on the site, parts of which are incorporated into today's structure. The Great Hall was the first part of the house to be built, in 1530. The Great (or Oak) Parlour wing was added in 1531. Around this time the North Bay was also added to the house. Between 1540 and 1570 the south wing was altered and extended. The west wing was added between 1546 and 1547. The last significant change to the building was in 1598, when the north range was added by Edward Norris. Since then there have only been minor changes to the Hall and gardens.

The oak frame, typical of the period, rests on a base of red sandstone surrounded by a now dry moat. The main beams of the house are stiffened with smaller timbers and filled with wattle and daub.

During the turmoil of the Reformation the Norrises were Roman Catholics so the house incorporated a priest hole and a special observation hole built into a chimney in a bedroom to allow the occupant to see the approach to the house to warn the priest that people were coming. There is also an eavesdrop (a small open hole under the eaves of the house) which allowed a servant to listen in on the conversations of people awaiting admission at the original front door.

In 1612 a porch was added to the Great Parlour. A laundry and dairy were founded in 1860; the laundry was altered in the 1950s.

The house was owned by the Norris family for many generations until 1736 when Mary Norris, the heiress, married Lord Sidney Beauclerk. After Mary's death in 1766 the house was leased to various tenants. Richard Watt, a Liverpool merchant, purchased the house and estate from the Beauclerks in 1795. The last surviving heir of the Watt family was Miss Adelaide Watt, who inherited the house and returned to it in 1878 at the age of 21 years. She died in 1921, leaving the house and estate in trust for 21 years, during which time it was looked after by the staff under the supervision of Thomas Whatmore, who had been butler to Miss Watt. At the end of this period, in 1943, the house passed into the ownership of the National Trust. The house was administered by Liverpool City Corporation from 1946 until 1974 when it passed to Merseyside County Council who carried out a seven-year programme of major structural repairs and restoration which was completed in 1983. The National Trust took over full responsibility in 1986.

The gardens date from the 1850s. In the courtyard of the main building are two ancient yew trees, male and female, called 'Adam' and 'Eve'. First recorded in correspondence dating to 1712, they are estimated to be at least 500 years old.

== 21st century ==
The Home Farm building has been renovated and now houses the shop, restaurant and reception. The laundry has been converted into the education room and the dairy contains interpretation material. Furthermore, rooms such as a gun room have been changed over the years and then changed back by the National Trust in order to show more of the History of Speke Hall. Walks in the grounds give panoramic views over the Mersey estuary towards the Wirral Peninsula. Liverpool John Lennon Airport is adjacent to Speke Hall. The house received 224,913 visitors in 2019.

== In art and literature ==
An engraving of a painting of the great hall by Thomas Allom was published in Fisher's Drawing Room Scrap Book, 1835, with a poetical illustration by Letitia Elizabeth Landon.

== Images ==
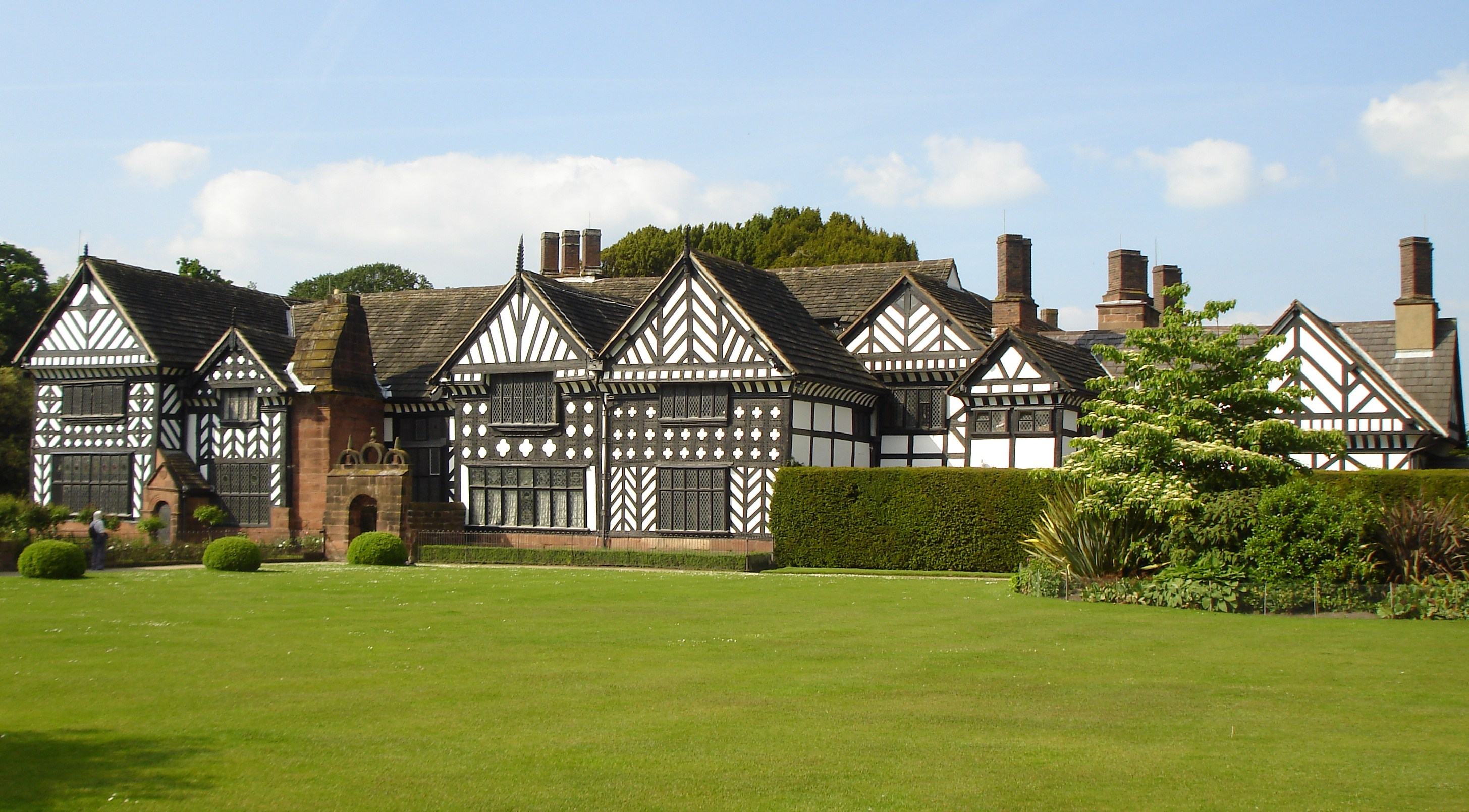
Speke Hall from the rear

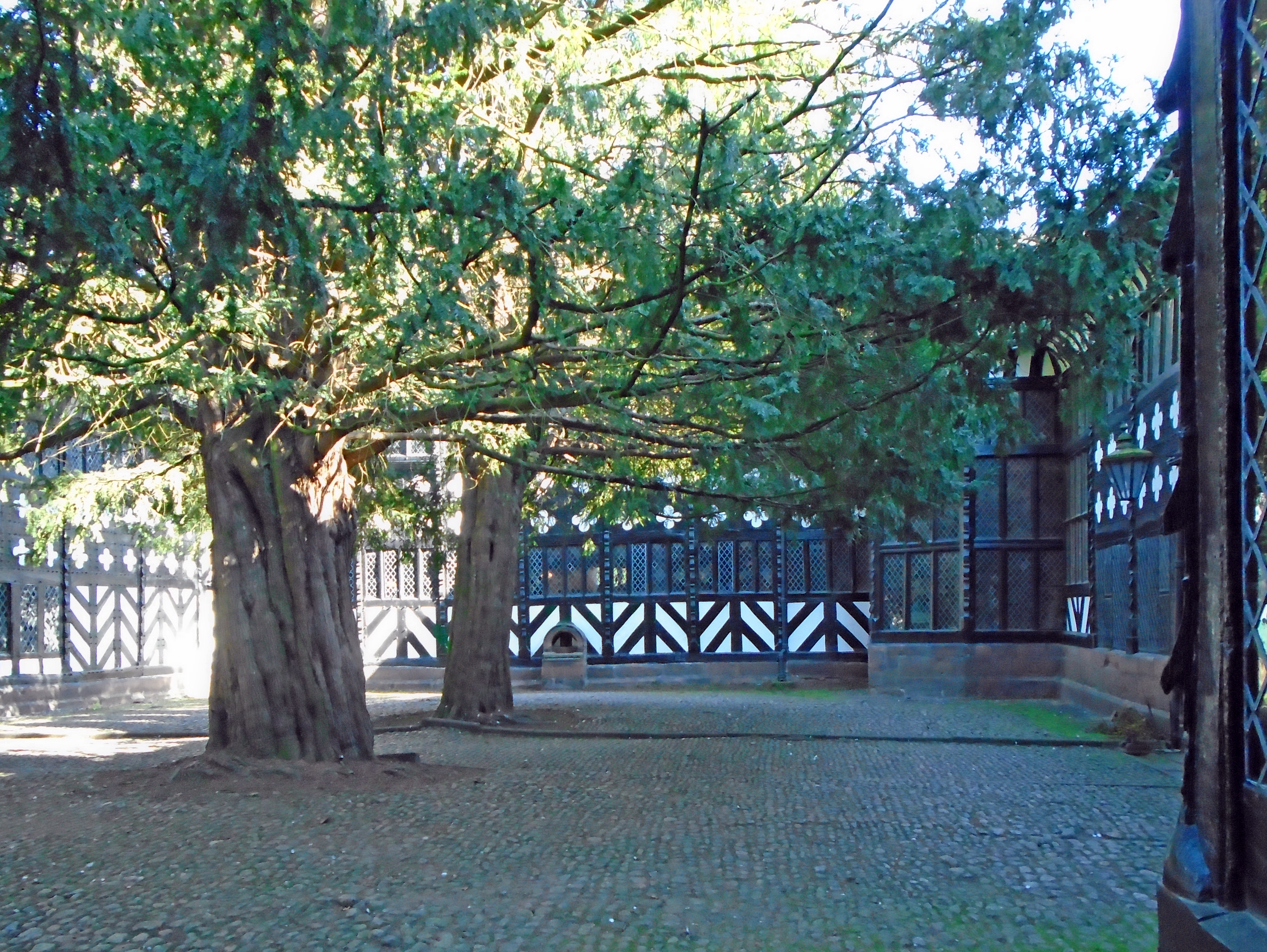
Courtyard at the centre of the hall

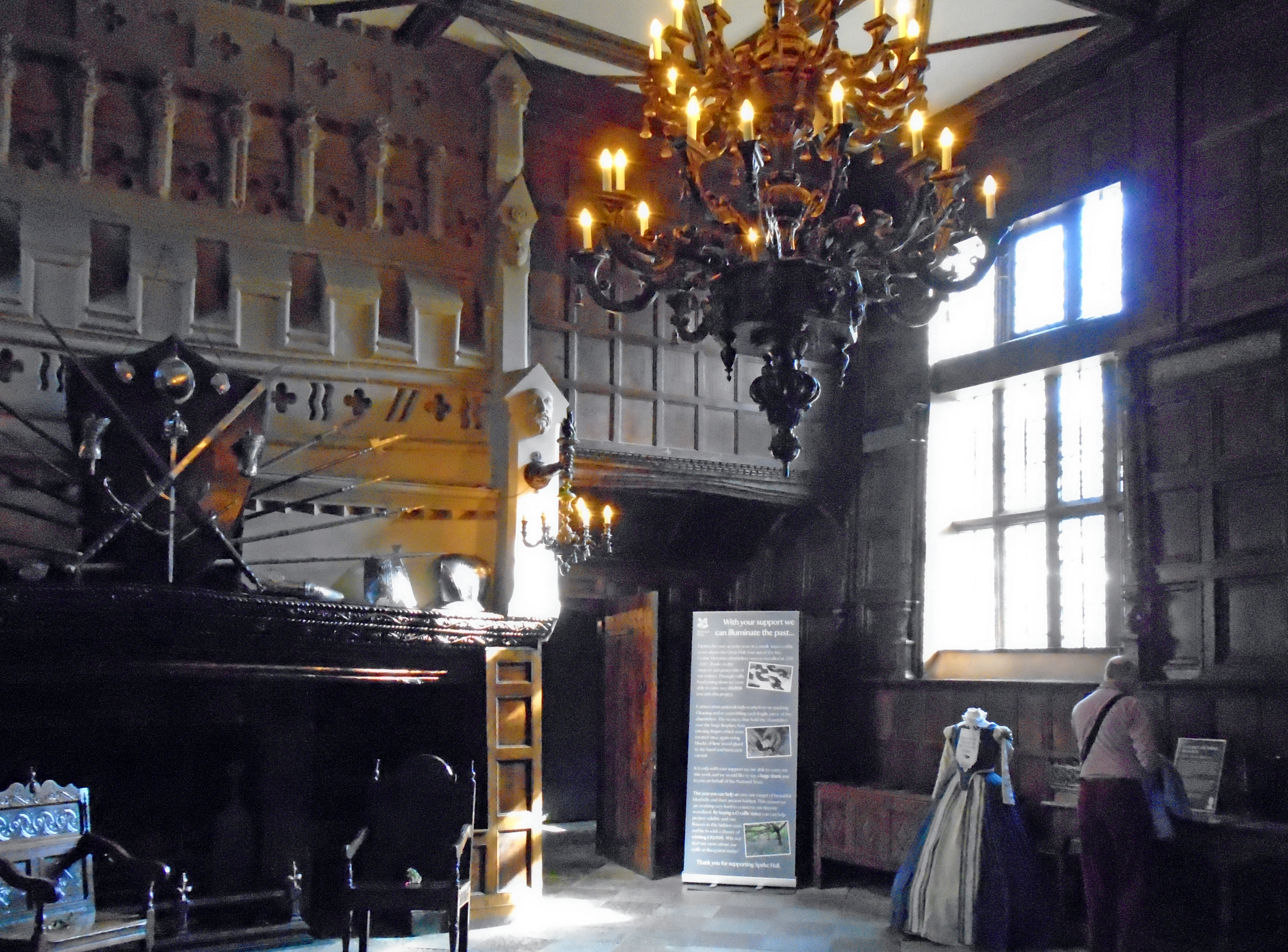
The Great Hall

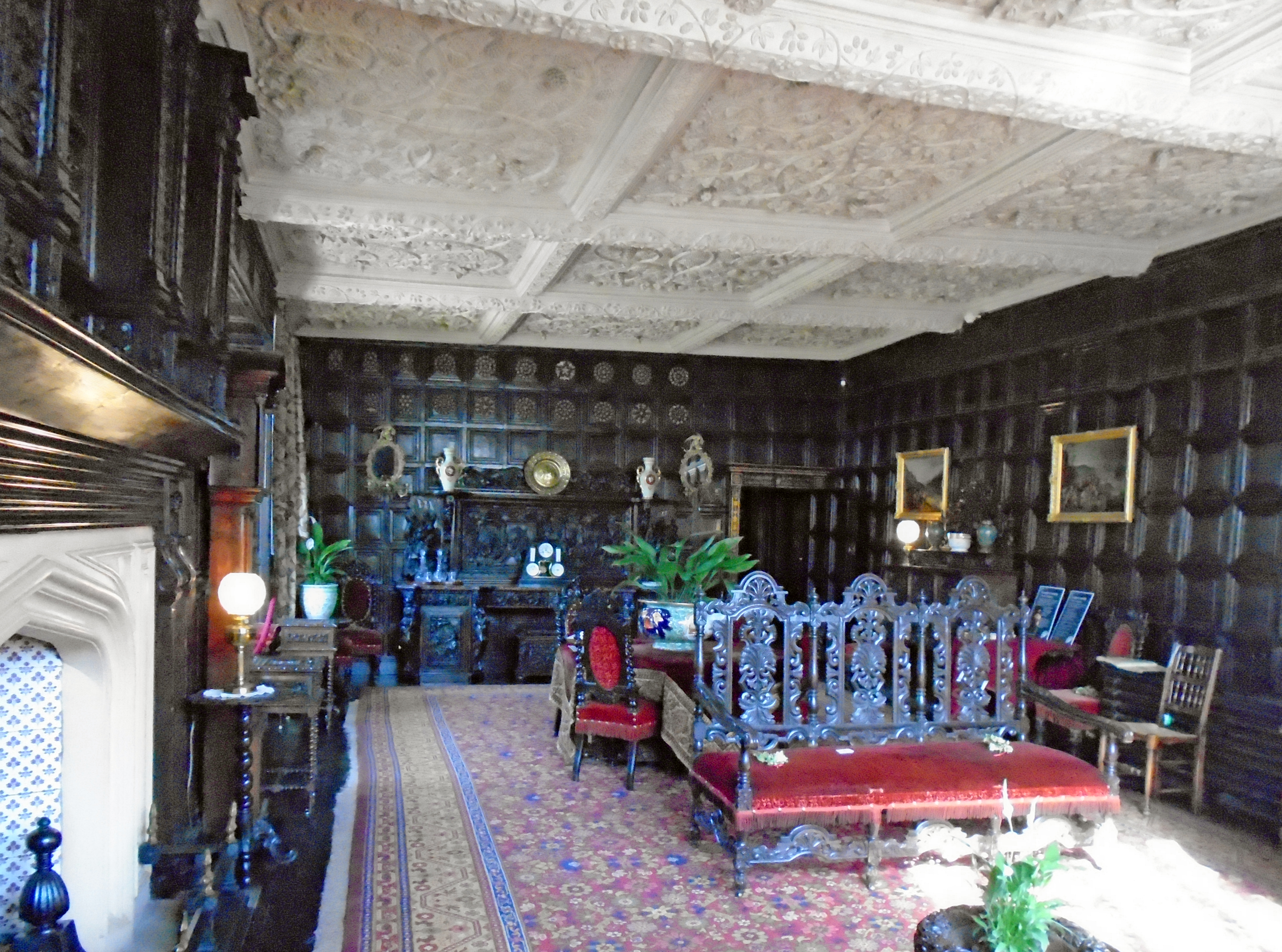
The Oak Parlour

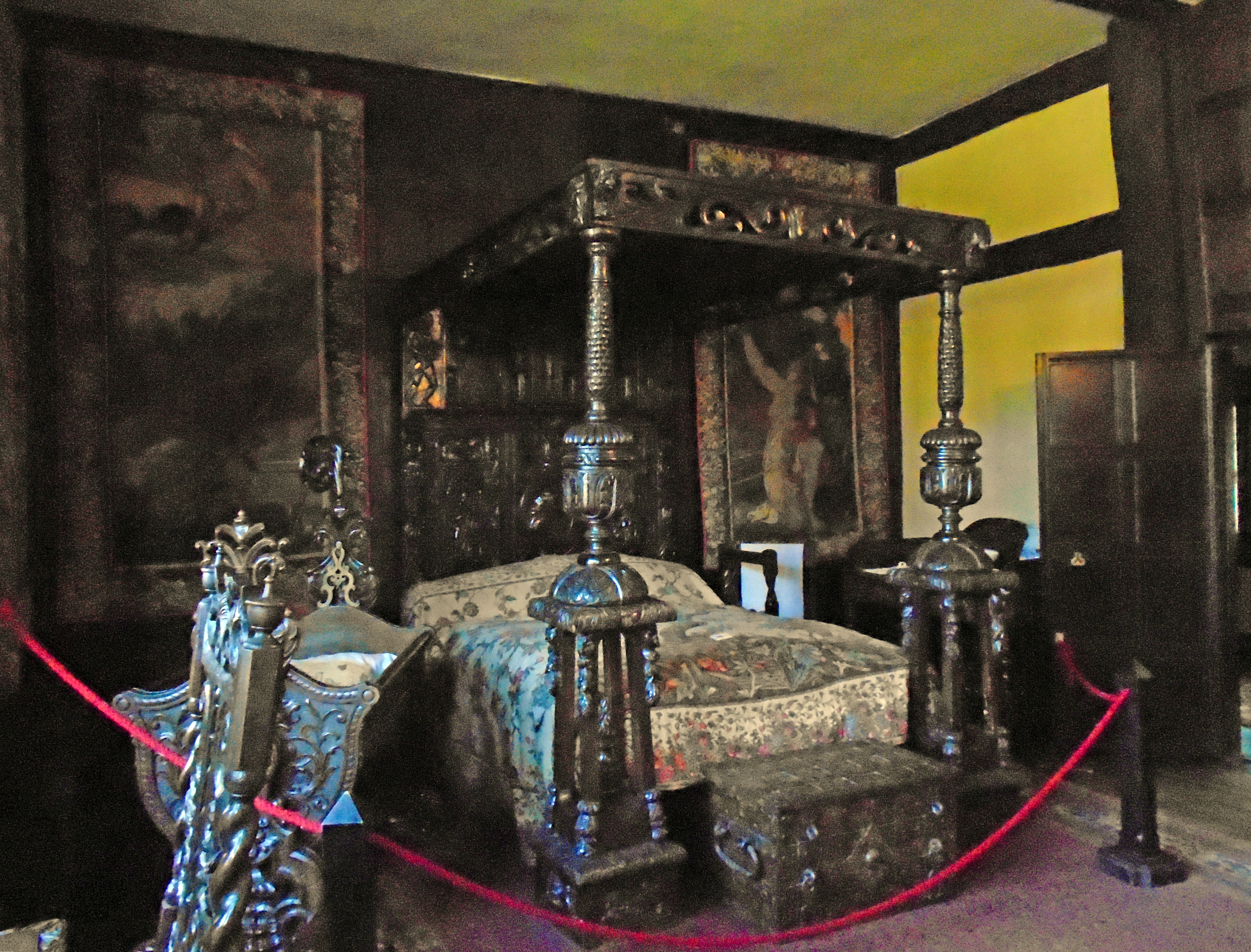
Tapestry bedroom

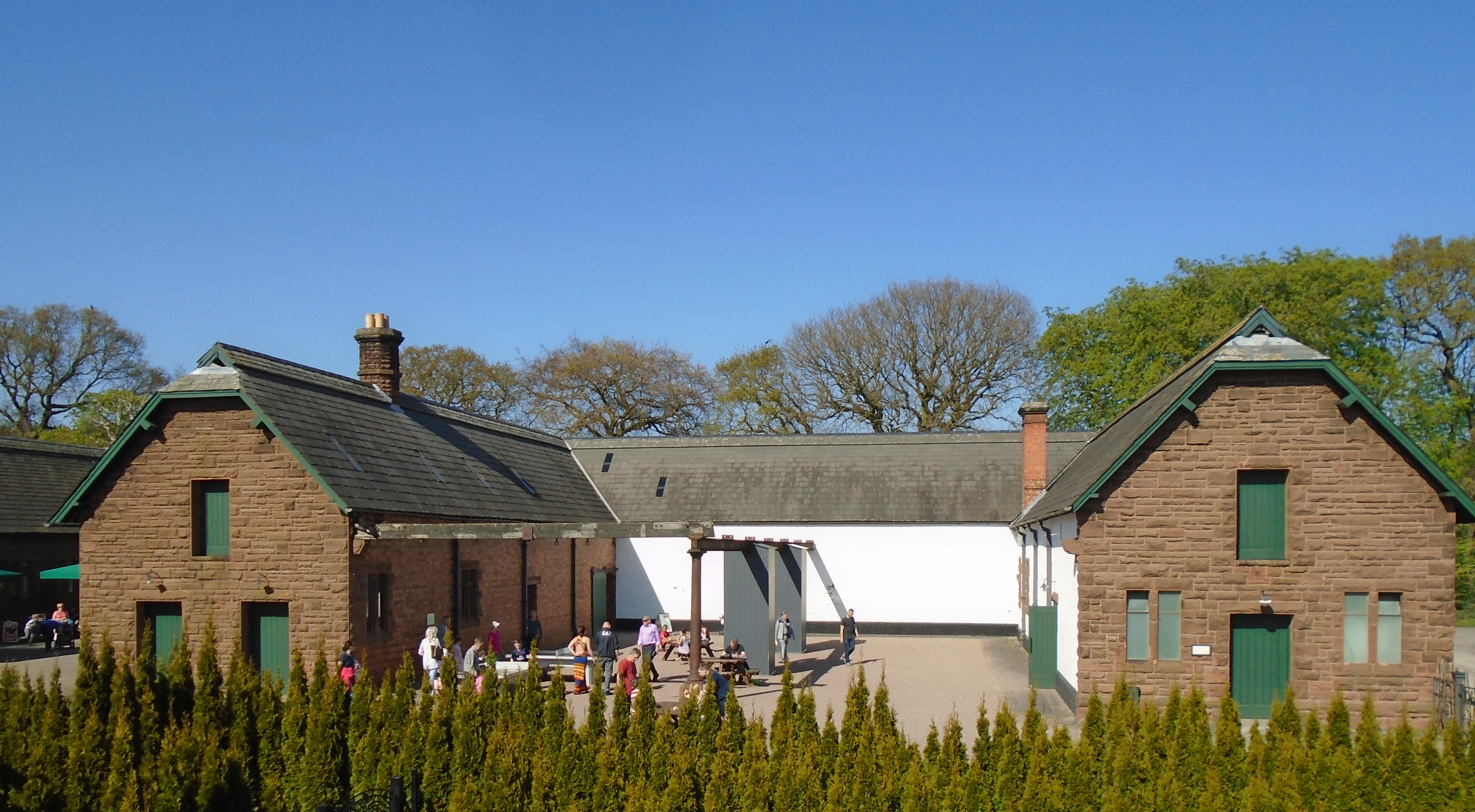
Visitor centre, the former home farm of the estate

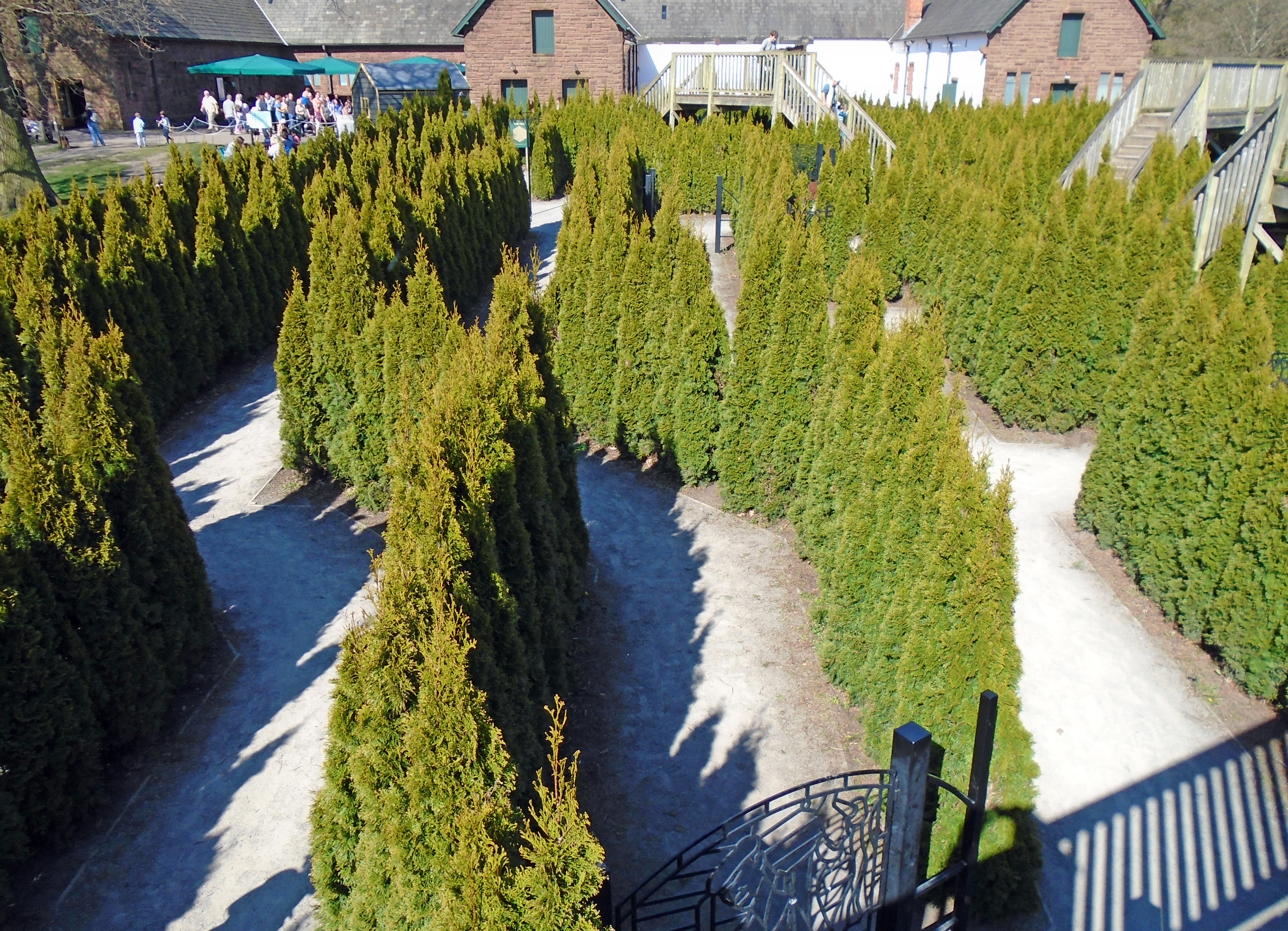
Maze behind the visitor centre
