= Richard Ashton (of Mawdesley) =

English lawyer and politician

Richard Ashton, of Mawdesley (c. 1553 – 1610) was an English lawyer and politician who sat in the House of Commons between 1601 and 1610.

Richard Ashton, of Mawdesley, baptized on 28 February or 25 December 1553, the son of Richard Ashton, of Croston and Jane daughter of Sir Robert Hesketh, of Rufford, Lancashire, was buried on 23 March 1611. He was married to Jane Cleyton on 18 September 1584. They had four sons and 1 daughter.

Ashton entered Gray's Inn in the 1570s as one of two individuals of that name, and is reported in 1584 as a Lancashire man and counsellor of Greys Inn who held mass in his chamber. In 1601, he was elected Member of Parliament for Newton. He was steward of Newton by 1603. In 1604, he was re-elected MP for Newton.

Parliament of England
Preceded by William Cope; Geoffrey Osbaldeston	Member of Parliament for Newton; 1601–1610; With: Thomas Langton (1601); Sir John Luke (1604–1610)	Succeeded by William Ashton; Roger Charnock
