= Crawshaw =

Crawshaw may refer to:

== Places ==
- Crawshaw, New Zealand, a suburb in western Hamilton in New Zealand
- Crawshaw, West Yorkshire, a location in England
- Crawshaw Academy, a secondary school with academy status in Pudsey, West Yorkshire, England
- Crawshawbooth, a village in Lancashire, England

== People with the surname ==
- Ernest Crawshaw (1889–1918), New Zealand cricketer
- Frances Crawshaw (1876–1968), English artist
- Frank Crawshaw (1899–1984), played Arnold Tanner in Coronation Street
- Jeremy Crawshaw (born 2001), Australian-American football player
- John Crawshaw Raynes VC (1887–1929), an English recipient of the Victoria Cross
- Raymond "Ray" Crawshaw (1908–1975), English professional footballer
- Richard Leigh "Dick" Crawshaw (1898–1965), English professional association football player
- Richard Crawshaw (1917–1986), British Labour Party Member of Parliament
- Robert Crawshaw (1869–1952), British water polo player and swimmer
- Thomas Brooks, 1st Baron Crawshaw (1825–1908), a British peer
- Tommy Crawshaw (1872–1960), English professional association football player
- William Crawshaw (1861–1938), New Zealand cricketer

== Other ==
- Baron Crawshaw, a title in the Peerage of the United Kingdom
