= Newton (constituency) =

Parliamentary constituency in the United Kingdom, 1885–1983

- Former borough constituency for the House of Commons
- Newton in Lancashire, showing boundaries used from 1974–1983
- County: Lancashire

1559–1832
- Seats: Two

1885–1983
- Seats: One
- Type of constituency: County constituency
- Created from: South West Lancashire
- Replaced by: Warrington North, St Helens North, Warrington South, Makerfield, Worsley and Leigh

Newton was a parliamentary borough in the county of Lancashire, in England. It was represented by two Members of Parliament in the House of Commons of the Parliament of England from 1559 to 1707 then of the Parliament of Great Britain from 1707 to 1800 and of the Parliament of the United Kingdom from 1801 until its abolition in 1832.

In 1885 a county constituency with the same name was created and represented by one Member of Parliament. This seat was abolished in 1983.

== Parliamentary borough ==
The borough consisted of the parish of Newton-le-Willows in the Makerfield district of South Lancashire. It was first enfranchised in 1558 (though the Parliament so summoned did not meet until the following year), and was a rotten borough from its inception: Newton was barely more than a village even at this stage, and so entirely dominated by the local landowner that its first return of members described it bluntly as "the borough of Sir Thomas Langton, knight, baron of Newton within his Fee of Markerfylde". By 1831, just before its abolition, the population of the borough had reached only 2,139, and contained 285 houses.

The right to vote was exercised by all freeholders of property in the borough valued at forty shillings or more, or by one representative of joint tenants of any such freeholds; Newton was the only borough where the forty-shilling freehold franchise (which applied in the counties) was the sole qualification to vote. In 1797, the borough's last contested election, 76 electors cast their votes; by 1831 it was estimated that the electorate had fallen to about 52. (As elsewhere, each elector had as many votes as there were seats to be filled and votes had to be cast by a spoken declaration, in public, at the hustings.)

In practice, however, the townsmen of Newton had no say in choosing their representatives: as the owners of the majority of the qualifying freeholds, the lords of the manor exercised total control. During most of the Elizabethan period, Langton seems to have allowed the Duchy of Lancaster to nominate many of the members, which may have been a quid pro quo for Newton's being enfranchised in the first place, but later patrons could regard its parliamentary seats as their personal property. Langton's heir sold the manor to the Fleetwood family in 1594, the sale explicitly including the right of "the nomination, election and appointment" of the two burgesses representing the borough in Parliament, one of the earliest recorded instances of the right to elect MPs being bought and sold. By the first half of the next century it had passed to the Leghs, who owned it for the rest of its existence.

By the time of the Reform Act 1832, Newton was one of the most notorious of all England's pocket boroughs, mainly because the Legh control was more complete than that of the patrons in most other constituencies. It was one of the 56 boroughs to be totally disenfranchised by the Reform Act.

== County constituency ==
The Redistribution of Seats Act 1885 created a new Newton constituency, as one of twenty-three divisions of the parliamentary county of Lancashire.

=== Boundaries 1885–1918 ===
The constituency, officially designated as South-West Lancashire, Newton Division consisted of a number of townships and parishes around Newton le Willows namely:

- Ashton in Makerfield
- Haydock
- Billinge Chapel End
- Billinge Higher End
- Part of Eccleston
- Rainhill
- Winstanley

The electorate also included the freeholders of the municipal boroughs of St Helens and Warrington who were entitled to vote in the county.

=== Boundaries 1918–1950 ===
The Representation of the People Act 1918 reorganised constituencies throughout the United Kingdom. Boundaries were adjusted and seats were defined in terms of the districts created by the Local Government Act 1894. According to the schedules of the Act, the Lancashire, Newton Division comprised:

- Golborne Urban District
- Haydock Urban District
- Newton in Makerfield Urban District
- Leigh Rural District (except the civil parish of Astley)
- Warrington Rural District

=== Boundaries 1950–1983 ===
The Representation of the People Act 1948 redistributed parliamentary seats, with the constituencies first being used in the general election of 1950. The term "county constituency" was introduced in place of "division". Newton County Constituency was redefined as consisting of the following districts:

- Golborne Urban District
- Haydock Urban District
- Irlam Urban District
- Newton-le-Willows Urban District
- Warrington Rural District

The changes reflected the fact that Leigh Rural District had been abolished in 1933, Newton in Makerfield Urban district had been renamed Newton le Willows in 1939. Irlam was transferred from the neighbouring Stretford constituency.

The boundaries were unchanged at the next redistribution of seats in 1970. Although local government was reorganised in 1972, boundaries were unchanged until 1983.

=== Abolition ===
The constituency was abolished by the Parliamentary Constituencies (England) Order 1983, which reorganised seats on the lines of the 1974 counties and districts, by which time the Newton constituency had become vastly oversized with an electorate of over 80,000 in 1979. The bulk of the seat formed part of the new Makerfield County Constituency. Irlam was included in the Worsley County Constituency, while part of Golborne became part of both Leigh Borough Constituency and Warrington North Borough Constituency. The town of Newton itself, as well as Haydock, were incorporated into the St Helens North Borough Constituency.

== Members of Parliament ==
=== MPs 1559–1660 ===
Parliament	First member	Second member
1559 (Jan)	Sir George Howard	Richard Chetwode
1562–3	Francis Alford	Ralph Browne
1571	Anthony Mildmay	Richard Stoneley
1572	John Gresham	John Savile
1584	Robert Langton	Edward Savage
1586 (Oct)	Robert Langton	Edward Savage
1588 (Oct)	Edmund Trafford	Robert Langton
1593	Edmund Trafford	Robert Langton
1597	William Cope	Geoffrey Osbaldeston
1601 (Oct)	Thomas Langton	Richard Ashton
1604	Sir John Luke	Richard Ashton
1614	William Ashton	Roger Charnock
1620–1 (Jan)	Sir George Wright	Richard Kippax
1624	Thomas Charnock	Edmund Breres
1625	Miles Fleetwood	Sir Henry Edmonds
1626	Miles Fleetwood	Sir Henry Edmonds
1627–8	Sir Henry Holcroft	Sir Francis Onslow
1629–1640	No parliaments summoned	
1640 (Apr)	Sir Richard Wynn, 2nd Baronet, sat for Andover	William Sherman
1640 (Nov)	William Ashurst	Peter Legh, died after duel and repl. by Sir Roger Palmer, disabled 1644 and repl. by Peter Brooke
1645	William Ashurst	Peter Brooke
1653–1658	Newton not represented in Barebones and First and Second Protectorate Parliaments	
1659	William Brereton	Peter Legh

=== MPs 1660–1832 ===
Year	First member	First party	Second member	Second party
1660	Richard Legh		William Banks	
April 1661	Richard Legh		John Vaughan	
June 1661	Richard Legh		Sir Philip Mainwaring	
October 1661	Richard Legh		The Lord Gorges of Dundalk	
1679	Sir John Chicheley		Andrew Fountaine	
1685	Sir John Chicheley		Peter Legh	
1689	Sir John Chicheley		Francis Cholmondeley	
1690	Sir John Chicheley		George Cholmondeley	
1691	John Bennet		George Cholmondeley	
1695	Legh Banks		Thomas Brotherton	
1698	Thomas Legh		Thomas Brotherton	
1701	Thomas Legh		Thomas Legh, junior	
July 1702	John Grubham Howe		Thomas Legh, junior	
December 1702	Thomas Legh		Thomas Legh, junior	
1703	John Ward		Thomas Legh, junior	
1713	John Ward		Abraham Blackmore	Tory
1715	Sir Francis Leicester		William Shippen	
1727	Legh Master		William Shippen	
1743	Legh Master		Peter Legh	
1747	Sir Thomas Egerton		Peter Legh	
1754	Randle Wilbraham		Peter Legh	
1768	Anthony James Keck		Peter Legh	
1774	Anthony James Keck		Robert Vernon Atherton Gwillym	
1780	Thomas Peter Legh		Thomas Davenport, KC	
1786	Thomas Peter Legh		Thomas Brooke	
September 1797	Thomas Langford Brooke		Thomas Brooke	
December 1797	Peter Patten		Thomas Brooke	
1806	Colonel Peter Heron		Thomas Brooke	
1807	Colonel Peter Heron		John Ireland Blackburne	
1814	Thomas Legh		John Ireland Blackburne	
1818	Thomas Legh		Thomas Claughton	
1825	Thomas Legh		Sir Robert Townsend-Farquhar	
1826	Thomas Legh		Thomas Alcock	
1830	Thomas Legh		Thomas Houldsworth	
1832	Constituency abolished			

=== MPs 1885–1983 ===
Election	Member	Party
1885	constituency re-established with one MP	
1885	R. A. Cross	Conservative
1886 by-election	Thomas Legh	Conservative
1899 by-election	Richard Pilkington	Conservative
1906	James Andrew Seddon	Labour
1910	Roundell Palmer	Conservative
1918	Robert Young	Labour
1931	Reginald Essenhigh	Conservative
1935	Robert Young	Labour
1950	Fred Lee	Labour
Feb 1974	John Evans	Labour
1983	constituency abolished	

== Elections ==
=== Elections in the 1880s ===
General election 1885: Newton
Party	Candidate	Votes	%	±%
Conservative	R. A. Cross	4,414	52.3	
Liberal	George McCorquodale	4,031	47.7	
Majority		383	4.6	
Turnout		8,445	90.4	
Registered electors		9,344		
Conservative win (new seat)				

General election 1886: Newton
Party	Candidate	Votes	%	±%
Conservative	R. A. Cross	4,302	55.2	+2.9
Liberal	George Errington	3,486	44.8	−2.9
Majority		816	10.4	+5.8
Turnout		7,788	83.3	−7.1
Registered electors		9,344		
Conservative hold		Swing	+2.9	

Cross was appointed Secretary of State for India and was elevated to the peerage, becoming Viscount Cross, causing a by-election.

By-election, 16 Aug 1886: Newton
Party	Candidate	Votes	%	±%
Conservative	Thomas Legh	4,062	54.8	−0.4
Liberal	Daniel O'Connell French	3,355	45.2	+0.4
Majority		707	9.6	−0.8
Turnout		7,417	79.4	−3.9
Registered electors		9,344		
Conservative hold		Swing	−0.4	

=== Elections in the 1890s ===
General election 1892: Newton
Party	Candidate	Votes	%	±%
Conservative	Thomas Legh	4,713	55.2	0.0
Liberal	William Neill	3,819	44.8	0.0
Majority		894	10.4	0.0
Turnout		8,532	85.4	+2.1
Registered electors		9,993		
Conservative hold		Swing	0.0	

General election 1895: Newton
Party	Candidate	Votes	%	±%
Conservative	Thomas Legh	5,358	58.2	+3.0
Liberal	James Moon	3,854	41.8	−3.0
Majority		1,504	16.4	+6.0
Turnout		9,212	83.2	−2.2
Registered electors		11,073		
Conservative hold		Swing	+3.0	

Legh is elevated to the peerage, becoming Lord Newton.

By-election, 16 Jan 1899: Newton
Party	Candidate	Votes	%	±%
Conservative	Richard Pilkington	Unopposed		
Conservative hold				

=== Elections in the 1900s ===
General election 1900: Newton
Party	Candidate	Votes	%	±%
Conservative	Richard Pilkington	Unopposed		
Conservative hold				

General election 1906: Newton
Party	Candidate	Votes	%	±%
Labour Repr. Cmte.	James Seddon	6,434	52.2	New
Conservative	Richard Pilkington	5,893	47.8	N/A
Majority		541	4.4	N/A
Turnout		12,327	89.1	N/A
Registered electors		13,837		
Labour Repr. Cmte. gain from Conservative		Swing	N/A	

=== Elections in the 1910s ===
General election January 1910: Newton
Party	Candidate	Votes	%	±%
Labour	James Seddon	7,256	52.7	+0.5
Liberal Unionist	Roundell Palmer	6,504	47.3	−0.5
Majority		752	5.4	+1.0
Turnout		13,760	93.0	+3.9
Registered electors		14,803		
Labour hold		Swing	+0.5	

General election December 1910: Newton
Party	Candidate	Votes	%	±%
Conservative	Roundell Palmer	6,706	50.5	+3.2
Labour	James Seddon	6,562	49.5	−3.2
Majority		144	1.0	N/A
Turnout		13,268	89.6	−3.4
Registered electors		14,803		
Conservative gain from Labour		Swing	+3.2	

General election 1918: Newton
Party		Candidate	Votes	%	±%
	Labour	Robert Young	9,808	55.0	+5.5
C	Unionist	Henry Lygon	8,014	45.0	−5.5
Majority			1,794	10.0	N/A
Turnout			17,822	73.0	−16.6
Registered electors			24,397		
	Labour gain from Unionist		Swing	+5.5	
C indicates candidate endorsed by the coalition government.

=== Elections in the 1920s ===
General election 1922: Newton
Party	Candidate	Votes	%	±%
Labour	Robert Young	12,312	55.6	+0.6
Unionist	Henry Baker Bates	8,214	37.1	−7.9
Independent	G.F. Clarke	1,618	7.3	New
Majority		4,098	18.5	+8.5
Turnout		22,144	86.1	+13.1
Registered electors		25,707		
Labour hold		Swing	+4.3	

General election 1923: Newton
Party	Candidate	Votes	%	±%
Labour	Robert Young	12,492	59.9	+4.3
Unionist	Henry Baker Bates	8,375	40.1	+3.0
Majority		4,117	19.8	+1.3
Turnout		20,867	78.5	−7.6
Registered electors		26,572		
Labour hold		Swing	+0.7	

General election 1924: Newton
Party	Candidate	Votes	%	±%
Labour	Robert Young	12,875	56.1	−3.8
Unionist	J.A.W. Watts	10,066	43.9	+3.8
Majority		2,809	12.2	−7.6
Turnout		22,941	84.6	+6.1
Registered electors		27,105		
Labour hold		Swing	−3.8	

General election 1929: Newton
Party	Candidate	Votes	%	±%
Labour	Robert Young	18,176	60.5	+4.4
Unionist	Reginald Essenhigh	11,887	39.5	−4.4
Majority		6,289	21.0	+8.8
Turnout		30,063	84.6	0.0
Registered electors		35,533		
Labour hold		Swing	+4.4	

=== Elections in the 1930s ===
General election 1931: Newton
Party	Candidate	Votes	%	±%
Conservative	Reginald Essenhigh	16,064	50.60	
Labour	Robert Young	15,683	49.40	
Majority		381	1.20	N/A
Turnout		31,747	85.88	
Conservative gain from Labour		Swing		

General election 1935: Newton
Party	Candidate	Votes	%	±%
Labour	Robert Young	19,992	58.5	+9.1
Conservative	Reginald Essenhigh	14,201	41.5	−9.1
Majority		5,791	17.0	N/A
Turnout		34,193	84.8	−1.1
Labour gain from Conservative		Swing		

=== Elections in the 1940s ===
General election 1945: Newton
Party	Candidate	Votes	%	±%
Labour	Robert Young	25,197	62.0	+3.5
Conservative	Kenneth Lewis	15,465	38.0	−3.5
Majority		9,732	24.0	+7.0
Turnout		40,662	76.2	−8.6
Labour hold		Swing		

=== Elections in the 1950s ===
General election 1950: Newton
Party	Candidate	Votes	%	±%
Labour	Frederick Lee	31,832	59.1	−2.9
Conservative	Kenneth Lewis	22,068	40.1	+2.1
Majority		9,764	18.0	−6.0
Turnout		53,900	88.0	+11.8
Labour hold		Swing		

General election 1951: Newton
Party	Candidate	Votes	%	±%
Labour	Frederick Lee	31,374	58.3	−0.8
Conservative	Herbert W Jones	22,476	41.7	+1.6
Majority		8,898	16.6	−1.4
Turnout		53,850	87.2	−0.8
Labour hold		Swing		

General election 1955: Newton
Party	Candidate	Votes	%	±%
Labour	Frederick Lee	29,299	57.9	−0.4
Conservative	Norman Miscampbell	21,344	42.2	+0.5
Majority		7,955	15.7	−0.9
Turnout		50,643	81.8	−5.4
Labour hold		Swing		

General election 1959: Newton
Party	Candidate	Votes	%	±%
Labour	Frederick Lee	31,041	57.4	−0.5
Conservative	Norman Miscampbell	23,065	42.6	+0.4
Majority		7,976	14.8	−0.9
Turnout		54,106	83.1	+1.3
Labour hold		Swing		

=== Elections in the 1960s ===
General election 1964: Newton
Party	Candidate	Votes	%	±%
Labour	Frederick Lee	32,932	56.0	−1.4
Conservative	David C Stanley	17,980	30.6	−12.0
Liberal	Clifford L Jones	7,919	13.5	New
Majority		14,952	25.4	+10.7
Turnout		58,831	82.0	−1.1
Labour hold		Swing		

General election 1966: Newton
Party	Candidate	Votes	%	±%
Labour	Frederick Lee	36,901	62.8	+6.8
Conservative	Peter H Craig	21,845	37.2	+6.6
Majority		15,056	25.6	+0.2
Turnout		58,746	78.0	−4.0
Labour hold		Swing		

=== Elections in the 1970s ===
General election 1970: Newton
Party	Candidate	Votes	%	±%
Labour	Frederick Lee	34,873	52.5	−10.3
Conservative	John Stanley	25,863	39.0	+1.8
Liberal	Robert Magee	5,678	8.6	New
Majority		9,010	13.5	−12.1
Turnout		66,414	74.0	−4.0
Labour hold		Swing		

General election February 1974: Newton
Party	Candidate	Votes	%	±%
Labour	John Evans	38,369	49.3	−3.2
Conservative	Barry Porter	23,599	30.3	−8.7
Liberal	Neveille Leather	15,939	20.5	+11.9
Majority		14,770	19.0	+5.5
Turnout		77,907	82.5	+8.5
Labour hold		Swing		

General election October 1974: Newton
Party	Candidate	Votes	%	±%
Labour	John Evans	38,956	53.3	+4.0
Conservative	Roger Baldwin	22,484	30.7	+0.4
Liberal	Neveille Leather	11,738	16.0	−4.5
Majority		16,472	22.6	+3.6
Turnout		73,178	76.8	−5.7
Labour hold		Swing		

General election 1979: Newton
Party	Candidate	Votes	%	±%
Labour	John Evans	41,466	51.4	−1.9
Conservative	Thomas Huntley	30,125	37.3	+6.6
Liberal	Rodney Smith	8,471	10.5	−5.5
National Front	A Fishwick	641	0.8	New
Majority		11,341	14.1	−8.5
Turnout		80,703	78.4	+1.6
Labour hold		Swing		

== See also ==
- List of former United Kingdom Parliament constituencies
- Unreformed House of Commons

== Sources ==
- Craig, F. W. S. (1983) [1969]. British parliamentary election results 1918-1949 (3rd ed.). Chichester: Parliamentary Research Services. ISBN 0-900178-06-X.
- J E Neale, The Elizabethan House of Commons (London: Jonathan Cape, 1949)
- J Holladay Philbin, Parliamentary Representation 1832 - England and Wales (New Haven: Yale University Press, 1965)
- Edward Porritt and Annie G Porritt, The Unreformed House of Commons (Cambridge University Press, 1903)
- Frederic A Youngs Jr, Guide to the Local Administrative Units of England, Vol II (London: Royal Historical Society, 1991)
- Leigh Rayment's Historical List of MPs – Constituencies beginning with "N" (part 2)
