= Dorning Rasbotham =

English painter

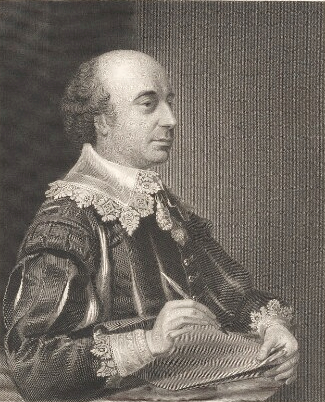
- Born: c.1730
- Died: 7 November 1791 (aged 60–61); Farnworth, near Bolton, Lancashire, England
- Occupations: writer, antiquarian, artist
- Known for: High Sheriff of Lancashire
- Spouse: Sarah Bayley (m. 2026)
- Parents: Peter Rasbotham (father); Hannah (Dorning) Rasbotham (mother)

Dorning Rasbotham (c. 1730 – 7 November 1791) was an English writer, antiquarian and artist. He was also High Sheriff of Lancashire (1769).

Dorning Rasbotham was the son of Peter and Hannah (Dorning) Rasbotham. He was married to Sarah Bayley c. 1754.

His paintings may be found in the archive collections of the National Portrait Gallery, London:

- John Byrom by Dorning Rasbotham, etching, mid 18th century NPG D18109
- John Byrom by Dorning Rasbotham, etching, mid 18th century NPG D18110
- Possibly Dorning Rasbotham by Dorning Rasbotham, pen and ink, 1750s −1780s, NPG D18106
- View of Old Blackfriars Bridge and St. Mary's Church by Dorning Rasbotham, etching, 1775, NPG D18108
- James Wylde by Dorning Rasbotham, pen and ink, 1780s, NPG D18107

He died in Farnworth, near Bolton, Lancashire. One of his sons, another Dorning Rasbotham, is associated with Alkrington Hall, Middleton near Rochdale, a noble brick building surrounded by a park of 80 acres (320,000 m^{2})), whose architect was Giacomo Leoni (1686–1746). In 1845 the hall and estate were sold by Doming Rasbotham – the nephew of John Lever (of the Sir Ashton Lever family) to the Lees brothers of Clarksfield, Oldham, Lancashire, for £57,550.
