= Edward Savage (died c. 1622) =

English politician

Edward Savage (c. 1560 – c. 1622) was an English politician.

He was a member (MP) of the Parliament of England for Newton in 1584 and 1586 and for Stockbridge in 1601.

== Early life ==
Savage was the son of Sir John Savage of Rock Savage, by his first wife Elizabeth Manners, daughter of Thomas Manners, 1st Earl of Rutland. Savage settled in Beaurepaire, where he entertained the Queen Elizabeth I in 1601.

== Career ==
Savage was first elected as the Member of Parliament for Newton in 1584 and was returned at Newton through his brother-in-law, Thomas Langton. He was then later supported in his appointment as Member of Parliament for Stockbridge in 1601, through his neighbour William, 3rd Lord Sandys. There is no evidence that he made a mark on the records of the House of Commons.

Parliament of England
| Preceded by John Greasham; John Savile | Member of Parliament for Newton; 1584–1588; With: Robert Langton | Succeeded by Edmund Trafford; Robert Langton |
| Preceded by Miles Sandys; Mark Steward | Member of Parliament for Stockbridge; 1601–1604; With: Thomas Grymes | Succeeded by William Fortescue; Edwin Sandys |
