= Henry Farrington =

English politician

Henry Farrington (by 1471 – 1549/51), of Farington, Leyland and Worden, Lancashire, was an English politician.

He was a member (MP) of the parliament of England for Lancashire in 1529.
