= Ernest Crawshaw =

New Zealand cricketer

Personal information
- Full name: Ernest Elgood Crawshaw
- Born: 23 June 1889; Christchurch, New Zealand
- Died: 9 October 1918 (aged 29); Le Cateau-Cambrésis, Nord, France
- Batting: Right-handed

Domestic team information
- Years: Team
- 1907-08 to 1913-14: Canterbury

Career statistics
Competition	First-class
Matches	8
Runs scored	73
Batting average	5.61
100s/50s	0/0
Top score	26
Balls bowled	724
Wickets	13
Bowling average	29.38
5 wickets in innings	0
10 wickets in match	0
Best bowling	2/20
Catches/stumpings	11/–
- Source: Cricinfo, 18 December 2017

Ernest Elgood Crawshaw (23 June 1889 – 9 October 1918) was a New Zealand cricketer who played first-class cricket for Canterbury. He died in France in World War I.

== Life and career ==
Ernest Crawshaw was born in Christchurch and educated at Christchurch Boys' High School, where he captained the school's cricket and rugby teams. In 1908 he was awarded the school's inaugural Deans Memorial Scholarship, presented to a senior boy with outstanding personal qualities. He became an accountant, and married Elsie Lorraine Gunn Francis. They had one son.

He played cricket for Canterbury while still at school and appeared several times for them before World War I, making some useful contributions as a bowler and fieldsman.

During the war he enlisted in the 1st Battalion Canterbury Regiment and travelled as part of D Company 36th Reinforcements to France, sailing from Wellington in May 1918. A sergeant-major, he was killed in action at Le Cateau on 9 October 1918.
