= John Fleetwood (died 1590) =

16th-century English politician

John Fleetwood (died 1590), of Colwich, Staffordshire and Penwortham, Lancashire, was the Member of Parliament for Staffordshire in 1572.
