= John Atherton (died 1617) =

English politician

John Atherton (c. 1557 – 1617), of Atherton Hall, Leigh, Lancashire, was a landowner and an English politician. He was appointed High Sheriff of Lancashire in 1582, and became a Member (MP) of the Parliament of England for Lancashire in 1586 and for Lancaster in 1589. His term in office coincided with the Spanish Armada and he was appointed captain of the Lancashire and Cheshire forces. He was 7th in descent from Sir William Atherton MP for the same county in 1381.

== Personal ==
He was the son of John Atherton and Margaret, daughter of Thomas Catterall of Catterall, Lancs.

He married Elizabeth, the daughter of Sir John Byron who was High Sheriff of Lancashire in 1572; a position his own father had held on multiple occasions under three different monarchs.

Atherton had three children with Elizabeth Byron. His second wife was Katherine, the daughter of John Conyers, 3rd Baron Conyers of Hornby Castle, North Yorkshire. They had one child John who married Ann, the daughter of Sir John Byron.

Atherton was buried in Leigh on 23 May 1617 and distinguished as an armiger in the burial register.

His son and heir, John (d. 1628) was a barrister in London.

His granddaughter Ann, daughter of his son William, married Sir William Pennyman, 1st Baronet who served as High Sheriff of Yorkshire in 1635-1636.
