= John Atherton (died 1573) =

English politician

Sir John Atherton (c. 1514 – 1573), of Atherton Hall, Leigh, Lancashire, was a landowner and an English politician. He was appointed High Sheriff of Lancashire in 1550, 1554, and 1560, and was a Member of Parliament (MP) of the Parliament of England for Lancashire in 1559. He was 6th in descent from Sir William Atherton MP for the same county in 1381.

Atherton first comes to notice in 1536, when he was under the employ of Edward Stanley, 3rd Earl of Derby during the expedition against the rebels in the north, known as the pilgrimage of Grace. Between October 1542 and May 1544 he was in charge of troops in northern England and in Scotland, where the Earl of Hertford knighted him at Leith in May 1544 following the Burning of Edinburgh and the sacking of Leith.

He served as High Sheriff of Lancashire in 1551 under the reign of Edward VI; again in 1554 during the reign of Mary I of England.

During the final years of the reign of Henry VIII, and under Edward VI, Atherton was active in raising and training men for the musters in Lancashire Militia, after the legal basis of a militia was updated by two acts of 1557 (4 & 5 Ph. & M. cc. 2 and 3). During September that year, he led a number of his tenants to join the Earl of Derby's forces against the Scots. Atherton kept up this work in the Lancashire militia until after the ascension of Elizabeth I.

His second wife, Margaret was a known recusant, and this led to suspicions on matters of his faith, which eventually curtailed his political career at the start of the reign of Elizabeth I, with the Act of Uniformity 1558.

He last served as High Sheriff of Lancashire in 1561 under Elizabeth I.

== Personal ==
He was the firstborn son of George Atherton by his 1st wife Anne, daughter of Richard Assheton of Middleton, Lancashire. His grandfather was Sir John de Atherton (Aðerton or Aderton), Lord of Atherton (1438–1488), who had served as High Sheriff of Durham in 1461.

He married Elizabeth, daughter of Sir Alexander Radcliffe or Ratcliffe of Ordsall when they were both children. Elizabeth was a relative of John Ratcliffe (soldier). Due to her infidelity, they were divorced in 1535 and he went on to marry Margaret, daughter of Thomas Catterall of Catterall, Lancs. They had 6 children. His former father in law, Sir Alexander served as High Sheriff in 1547.

On 18 April 1573 he made his will, settling his property on his eldest son, John Atherton. He died between 30 June and 4 July in that year and was buried at Leigh on 8 July 1573.
