= Edmund Trafford (died 1620) =

Member of the Parliament of England

Sir Edmund Trafford (c. 1560 – 8 May 1620), of Trafford, Lancashire, was an English Member of Parliament, where he represented Newton in 1589 and 1593. He held the office of High Sheriff of Lancashire and was appointed Knight on 17 April 1603, after he accompanied his uncle, Sir Robert Cecil, to meet King James at York.

== Family ==
Trafford was the son of Edmund Trafford (1526-1590) and Elizabeth Leicester. He married firstly, Mary Booth, who had been contracted to marry since the couple were 13 and 12 years old respectively. After the breakdown of the marriage, Trafford married Lady Mildred Cecil (the daughter of Thomas Cecil and the grand-daughter of William Cecil, Queen Elizabeth's Secretary of State) after her first husband, Sir Thomas Reade, died.

Trafford had issue with his first wife, Mary Booth:

- Elizabeth Trafford
- Edmond Trafford
- John Trafford

Trafford had issue with his second wife, Mildred Cecil:

- Cecily Trafford
- Sir Cecil Trafford

Parliament of England
Preceded by Robert Langton; Edward Savage	Member of Parliament for Newton; 1589–1597; With: Robert Langton	Succeeded by William Cope; Geoffrey Osbaldeston
