= William Norris (1501–1568) =

English politician (1501–1568)

Sir William Norris (1501 – 30 January 1568), of Speke, Lancashire, was an English member of parliament.

== Biography ==
Born 1501, Norris was the eldest son of Henry Norris of Speke whom he succeeded in 1524. He was knighted in 1531.

Norris was appointed High Sheriff of Lancashire for 1544–45 and served as a justice of the peace for Cheshire in 1547. He was Mayor of Liverpool for 1554–55. In April 1554, he was elected a member (MP) of the Parliament of England for Liverpool.

Norris died on 30 January 1568, aged 66 or 67, and was buried in Childwall. He had married twice: firstly Ellen, the daughter of Rowland Bulkeley of Beaumaris, Anglesey, with whom he had a son and 6 daughters and secondly Anne, the daughter and coheiress of David Myddelton of Chester, Cheshire, and the widow of Thomas Seton, with whom he had another 6 sons and 6 daughters. He was succeeded by his third but eldest surviving son Edward. His eldest son, William, was killed during the battle of Pinkie in 1547.
