= John Savile (died 1607) =

Member of the Parliament of England

Sir John Savile (1546–1607) was an English lawyer and judge.

== Life ==
He was the eldest son of Henry Savile of Bradley, near Stainland, Yorkshire, by his wife Elizabeth, only daughter of Robert Ramsden; Sir Henry Savile and Thomas Savile were younger brothers. He matriculated at Brasenose College, Oxford, in 1561, but did not graduate. To avoid the plague in 1563, he remained in Bradley, where he studied law books on his own.

Savile entered the Middle Temple, where he was autumn reader in 1586. In 1572 he was elected member of parliament for Newton, Lancashire. His candidacy has been attributed to friendship with William Fleetwood; another friend and parliamentarian was Henry Gates.

Savile practised in the exchequer court, and in 1594 he was made serjeant-at-law. In 1598 he became baron of the exchequer on Lord Burghley's recommendation. In 1599 he was placed on a commission for suppressing heresy. He was knighted by James I on 25 July 1603, and in 1604 was made chief justice of the county palatine of Lancaster.

In November 1606 Savile was one of the barons of the exchequer who decided that the king could by royal prerogative levy impositions on imports and exports. He had consistently supported the common law courts against the prerogative in his earlier judicial career, however. He died on 2 February 1607, and was buried in St. Dunstan's-in-the-West, London; his heart was taken to Methley in Yorkshire, in the church of which a monument, with an inscription, was erected to his memory. Like other members of his family, Savile was a friend of William Camden, whom he entertained at Bradley in August 1599. He was also an original member of the College of Antiquaries.

== Works ==
The only published work by Savile is the collection of Reports of cases tried in the exchequer court, edited (1675) by John Richardson.

== Family ==
Savile was four times married:

1. to Jane, daughter of Richard Garth of Morden, Surrey, by whom he had issue a son Henry, and two daughters;
2. to Elizabeth, daughter of Thomas Wentworth of North Elmsall, Yorkshire, by whom he had issue John (died 1651), who was heir to his half-brother Henry, and great-grandfather of John Savile, 1st Earl of Mexborough (1719–1778);
3. to Dorothy, daughter of Thomas Wentworth, 1st Baron Wentworth (died 1551), and widow of Sir W. Widmerpoole and then of Sir Martin Frobisher; and
4. to Margery, daughter of Ambrose Peake, and widow of Sir Jerome Weston.

By his last two wives, Savile had no issue.

Parliament of England
Preceded by Anthony Mildmay; Richard Stoneley	Member of Parliament for Newton; 1572–1584; With: John Gresham	Succeeded by Robert Langton; Edward Savage
