= Edmund Neville (disambiguation) =

Edmund Neville (died c.1620) was an English courtier.

Edmund Neville may also refer to:

- Edmund Neville Nevill (1849–1940), British astronomer
- Edmund de Neville, 14th-century MP for Lancashire
