= Robert Reynolds (MP) =

English lawyer and Member of Parliament

Sir Robert Reynolds (c. 1601–1678) was an English lawyer and Member of Parliament (MP) in the Long Parliament who took the parliamentary side on the outbreak of the Civil War. He served as Solicitor General and Attorney General during the First Commonwealth and supported the restoration of the Monarchy during the Second.

== Biography ==
Robert was son of Sir James Reynolds of Castle Camps in Cambridgeshire (knighted 28 April 1618), and brother of Sir John Reynolds (d. 1657), represented Hindon, Wiltshire, in the Long parliament, and took the parliamentary side from the beginning of the civil war.

Robert is described in his marriage licence in 1634 as a member of the Inner Temple, but his name does not appear in the list of admissions to that body. He was probably a member of the Middle Temple, for on 26 October 1644 the House of Commons voted him the chambers and library of Sir Edward Hyde in that society.

In October 1642 Reynolds and Robert Goodwin were sent by the House of Commons to Dublin as commissioners representing the parliament. They were allowed by the connivance of the lords justices to be present at the meetings of the Irish Privy Council, and used their opportunities to endeavour to make a party for the parliament among officers and officials. Charles rebuked the lords justices, and ordered the arrest of the commissioners (1 March 1643), but they left Ireland before the order could be executed. On 3 January 1644 Reynolds was appointed a member of the Westminster assembly. of whose exaggerated claims he subsequently expressed his disapproval. When the quarrel between the New Model Army and the parliament came to a head he endeavoured to maintain a neutral position, and, though nominated one of the commissioners for the king's trial, refused to act. Nevertheless, he returned to his place in the house of Commons after the king's death, thinking, as he said, that he might do some good, and resolving to "keep as much of the people's rights as I could". Reynolds was pledged to the republican cause by his purchases of confiscated lands. "Besides Abingdon Hall and the lands worth £400 per annum, he hath bought a good pennyworth of bishops' lands", says a contemporary libeller, and in one of his speeches he refers to an investment of £8,000 in such property. On 6 June 1650 Reynolds was appointed solicitor-general to the Commonwealth, but failed in the succeeding February to be elected to the Council of State.

With the expulsion of the Rump Parliament by Oliver Cromwell in 1653, Reynolds for a time disappeared from public life. In 1659 he sat in Richard Cromwell's parliament as member for Whitchurch, Hampshire, and distinguished himself by a long speech against the bill for recognising Richard Cromwell's Protectorship, while professing the greatest esteem for Richard's person. If proper constitutional securities were given for the rights of the people, he was willing to accept the new Protector. "Against the single person there is not one exception; not any other man in this nation would pass so clearly". After Richard's fall, Reynolds took his seat in the restored Rump parliament, and was elected a member of the Council of State on 14 May 1659, and again on 31 December 1659. He also became again solicitor-general, and on 18 January 1660 was raised to the dignity of attorney-general. As he had been one of the nine members of the Council of State who promised to assist George Monck in his action against John Lambert (General) (19 November 1659), "promoted Monck's policy by his action in Parliament, and laboured for the readmission of the members" to reconstitute the Long Parliament, he found no difficulty in making his peace at the Restoration, On 31 May 1660 Reynolds petitioned King Charles II for leave to retire with pardon and protection into the country. Charles granted his request, and even conferred the honour of knighthood upon him on 4 June 1660.

== Family ==
Reynolds married, first, in 1635, Mary, daughter of Nathaniel Deards of Dunmow, Essex; secondly, on 23 May 1646, Priscilla, daughter of Sir Hugh Wyndham of Pillesdon, Dorset. His second wife remarried, in 1683, Henry Alexander, 4th Earl of Stirling, and died in 1691.

== Notes ==
Political offices
| Preceded by John Cooke | Solicitor General for England and Wales; 1650–1654 | Succeeded by William Ellis |
| Preceded by Edmund Prideaux | Attorney General for England and Wales; 1660 | Succeeded by Sir Geoffrey Palmer |
