= Edmund Trafford (1526–1590) =

English politician

Edmund Trafford (1526–1590), of Trafford, Lancashire, was an English politician.

He was a member (MP) of the parliament of England for Lancashire in 1572.

Trafford owned land in a large number of parishes in Lancashire, Cheshire and Derbyshire. Trafford contributed £100 to the Armada fund in 1588.
