= Kay-Shuttleworth =

Kay-Shuttleworth is a surname, created when James Kay (1804-1877) married Janet Shuttleworth (1817-1872) of Gawthorpe Hall on 24 March 1842 and took her name as part of their marriage settlement, becoming James Kay-Shuttleworth.

Notable people with the surname include:

- Charles Kay-Shuttleworth, 5th Baron Shuttleworth (born 1948), hereditary peer, son of Charles Ughtred John
- Charles Ughtred John Kay-Shuttleworth, 4th Baron Shuttleworth (1917–1975), grandson of Ughtred
- James Kay-Shuttleworth, 1st Baronet (1804-1877), English politician and educationist
- Rachel Kay-Shuttleworth (1886-1967), English embroiderer, lace-maker, textile collector and public figure, daughter of Ughtred
- Richard Ughtred Paul Kay-Shuttleworth, 2nd Baron Shuttleworth (1913–1940), grandson of Ughtred
- Ronald Orlando Lawrence Kay-Shuttleworth, 3rd Baron Shuttleworth (1917–1942), grandson of Ughtred
- Thomas Edward Kay-Shuttleworth (born 1976), heir-apparent to the title of Baron Shuttleworth, son of Charles
- Ughtred Kay-Shuttleworth, 1st Baron Shuttleworth (previously 2nd Baronet) (1844-1939), son of James

== See also ==
- Kay-Shuttleworth baronets
