= Ughtred Kay-Shuttleworth, 1st Baron Shuttleworth =

British landowner and politician (1844–1939)

The Right Honourable The Lord Shuttleworth PC DL

Under-Secretary of State for India
- In office 7 February 1886 – 12 April 1886
- Monarch: Victoria
- Prime Minister: William Ewart Gladstone
- Preceded by: The Lord Harris
- Succeeded by: Stafford Howard

Chancellor of the Duchy of Lancaster
- In office 16 April 1886 – 20 July 1886
- Monarch: Victoria
- Prime Minister: William Ewart Gladstone
- Preceded by: Edward Heneage
- Succeeded by: The Viscount Cranbrook

Parliamentary and Financial Secretary to the Admiralty
- In office 19 August 1892 – 21 June 1895
- Monarch: Victoria
- Prime Minister: William Ewart Gladstone; The Earl of Rosebery
- Preceded by: Arthur Forwood
- Succeeded by: William Ellison-Macartney

Personal details
- Born: 18 December 1844 Westminster, London, UK
- Died: 20 December 1939 (aged 95)
- Party: Liberal
- Spouse: Blanche Parish (d. 1924)
- Parent: James Kay-Shuttleworth (father)
- Education: University of London

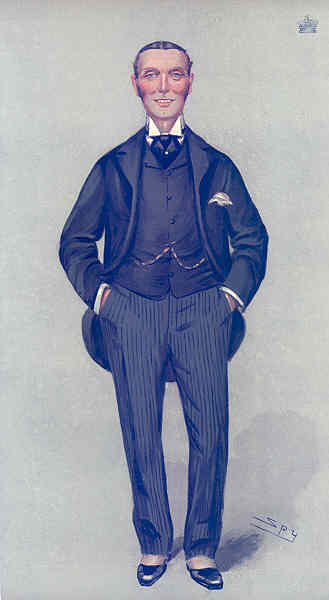
Caricature by Spy (Leslie Ward) in Vanity Fair, August 1904

Ughtred James Kay-Shuttleworth, 1st Baron Shuttleworth, PC, DL (18 December 1844 – 20 December 1939), known as Sir Ughtred Kay-Shuttleworth, 2nd Baronet between 1872 and 1902, was a British Liberal politician and landowner. He was Under-Secretary of State for India and Chancellor of the Duchy of Lancaster under William Ewart Gladstone in 1886 and Parliamentary and Financial Secretary to the Admiralty under Gladstone and Lord Rosebery between 1892 and 1895.

== Background ==
Shuttleworth was a son of the physician, civil servant and social reformer James Kay-Shuttleworth. He was born in Westminster, London, attended Harrow School and graduated from the University of London. His father, born James Kay, had assumed the additional surname of Shuttleworth on his marriage to Janet Shuttleworth, the only child and heiress of Robert Shuttleworth, of Gawthorpe Hall in Padiham, Lancashire. His father's brothers included the economist Joseph Kay and the Lord Justice of Appeal Sir Edward Kay.

The Shuttleworth family had been landowners in Lancashire from medieval times. Tradition states they made their fortune from wool weaving. They supported the parliamentary side in the English Civil War. Sir James and Lady Shuttleworth parted company after five children and Shuttleworth was raised largely apart from his father. For some years in his youth he lived in Germany with his mother. On her death, in 1872, he inherited large estates, including Gawthorpe Hall. His father then relocated to another of the estates, in Westmorland.

== Political career ==
Shuttleworth was returned to parliament for Hastings in 1869, a seat he held until 1880. He remained out of parliament until 1885, when he was elected for the Clitheroe division of Lancashire, a constituency he continued to represent until his elevation to the peerage in 1902. When the Liberals came to power under William Ewart Gladstone in February 1886, Shuttleworth was made Under-Secretary of State for India. Already in April he became Chancellor of the Duchy of Lancaster, replacing Edward Heneage, who had resigned over Irish Home Rule. He was sworn of the Privy Council at the same time. He remained Chancellor of the Duchy of Lancaster until the Liberals fell from power in July 1886.

Shuttleworth returned to office under Gladstone in 1892 when he was made Parliamentary and Financial Secretary to the Admiralty, a post he held until 1895, the last year under the premiership of Lord Rosebery. In the 1902 Coronation Honours, he was raised to the peerage as Baron Shuttleworth, of Gawthorpe, in the County Palatine of Lancaster. From 1908 to 1928 he was Lord Lieutenant of Lancashire, in which capacity in 1910 he entertained King George V and Queen Mary at Gawthorpe Hall.

== Family ==
Lord Shuttleworth married Blanche Marion, daughter of Sir Woodbine Parish, in 1871. They had two sons and four daughters (Angela, Nina, Rachel, Lawrence, Edward and Catherine). Both his sons, Captain the Hon. Lawrence Ughtred Kay-Shuttleworth (1887–1917) and T/Captain the Hon. Edward James Kay-Shuttleworth (1890–1917) were killed in the First World War. Lady Shuttleworth died in June 1924. Lord Shuttleworth survived her by fifteen years and died in December 1939, aged 95.

He was succeeded in his titles by his grandson, Richard Kay-Shuttleworth, 2nd Baron Shuttleworth, eldest son of the Hon. Lawrence Kay-Shuttleworth. The second baron was killed during the Battle of Britain only eight months later, when his Hawker Hurricane went missing during a battle over a Channel convoy, south of the Isle of Wight.

His granddaughter by his youngest daughter Catherine was Freydis Sharland, an Air Transport Auxiliary pilot during the Second World War and one of the first women to earn RAF wings.

Richard's younger brother, Ronald Kay-Shuttleworth, 3rd Baron Shuttleworth, was killed in North Africa in 1942. The barony passed to Ronald's first cousin, Charles, the fourth Baron Shuttleworth. He was badly injured in the Second World War, losing one leg and the use of the other. He moved to another home, Leck Hall at Leck, Lancashire, on his estates, which was more convenient to his disability, leaving his aunt Rachel to continue living at Gawthorpe Hall until her death in 1967. The estate became a National Trust property in 1970.

== Works ==
- Kay-Shuttleworth, U. J.; Waterlow, Sir Sydney (1874). "Dwelling of Working People in London" . Dwellings of working-people in London. London: Ridgway.

Parliament of the United Kingdom
| Preceded by Frederick North; Thomas Brassey | Member of Parliament for Hastings; 1869–1880; With: Thomas Brassey | Succeeded by Charles James Murray; Thomas Brassey |
| Preceded by Richard Fort | Member of Parliament for Clitheroe; 1885–1902 | Succeeded by David Shackleton |
Political offices
| Preceded by The Lord Harris | Under-Secretary of State for India; 1886 | Succeeded by Stafford Howard |
| Preceded by Edward Heneage | Chancellor of the Duchy of Lancaster; 1886 | Succeeded by The Viscount Cranbrook |
| Preceded by Arthur Forwood | Parliamentary and Financial Secretary to the Admiralty; 1892–1895 | Succeeded by William Ellison-Macartney |
Honorary titles
| Preceded by The Earl of Derby | Lord Lieutenant of Lancashire; 1908–1928 | Succeeded by The Earl of Derby |
Baronetage of the United Kingdom
| Preceded by James Phillips Kay-Shuttleworth | Baronet (of Gawthorpe Hall); 1877–1939 | Succeeded by Richard Kay-Shuttleworth |
Peerage of the United Kingdom
| New creation | Baron Shuttleworth; 1902–1939 | Succeeded by Richard Kay-Shuttleworth |
