= Pulham Market Big Wood =

UK Site of Special Scientific Interest

Coordinates: 52.459°N 1.244°E

- Site of Special Scientific Interest
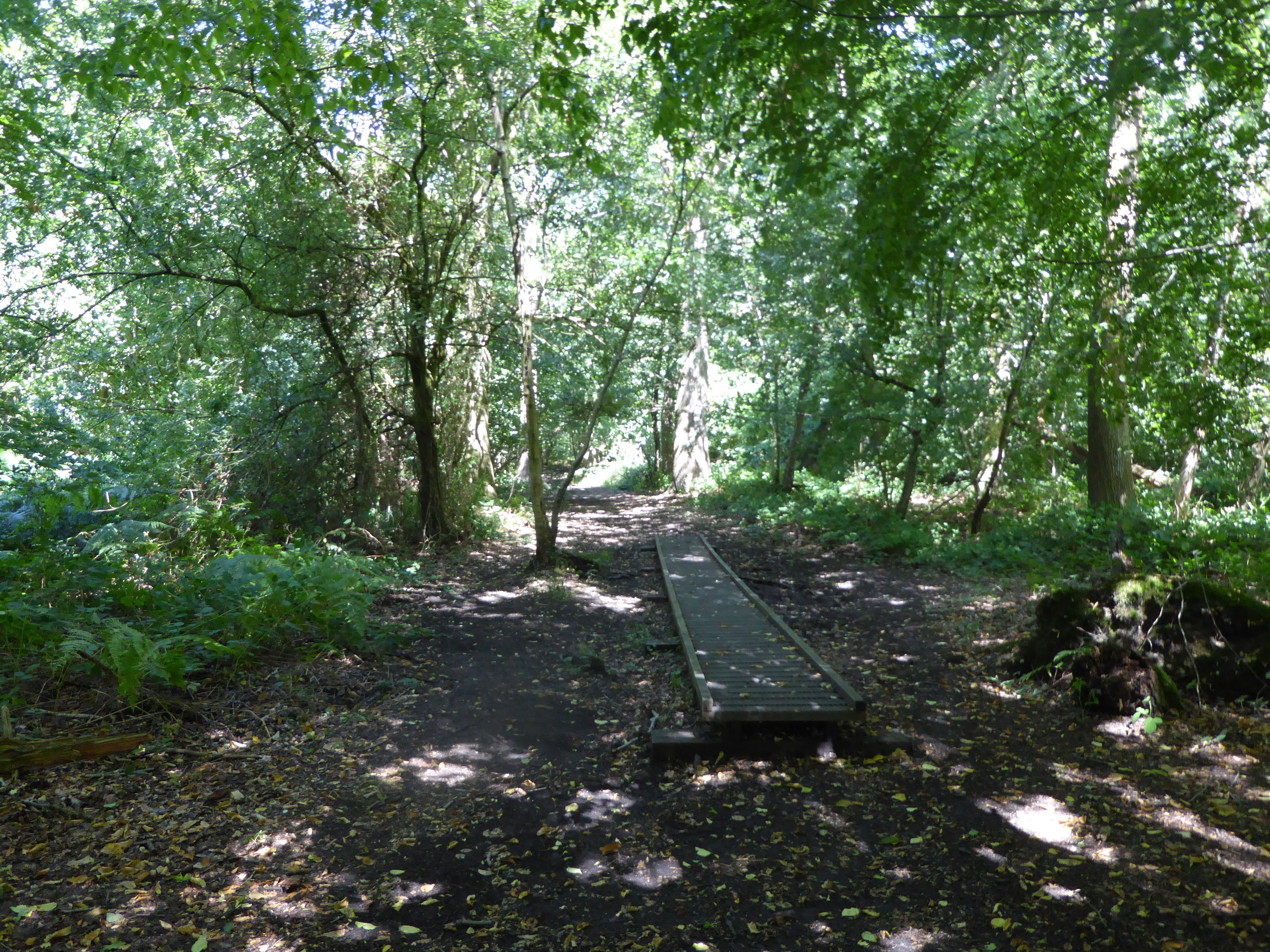
- Location of Pulham Market Big Wood.
- Area of search: Norfolk
- Grid reference: TM 205 895
- Interest: Biological
- Area: 4.7 hectares (12 acres)
- Notification date: 1986
- Location map: Magic Map

Pulham Market Big Wood is a 4.7-hectare (12-acre) biological Site of Special Scientific Interest south of Long Stratton in Norfolk, England.

The ancient coppice wood on boulder clay is probably the last fragment of a much larger area of woodland. The standard trees are mature pedunculate oaks and the coppice layer is very overgrown. The ground flora is dominated by bramble, honeysuckle and bracken.

Boudica's Way footpath runs through the wood.
