= Listed buildings in Leck, Lancashire =

Leck is a civil parish in Lancaster, Lancashire, England. It contains 21 listed buildings that are recorded in the National Heritage List for England. All of the listed buildings are designated at Grade II, the lowest of the three grades, which is applied to "buildings of national importance and special interest". Other than the small settlement of Leck, the parish is rural. The most substantial building in the parish is Leck Hall; this and associated buildings are listed. Most of the other listed buildings are houses, farmhouses and associated structures. Also listed are a church and stones of various types.

== Buildings ==
Name and location	Photograph	Date	Notes
Crow Trees Cottage and barn 54.18571°N 2.55199°W	—	Late 17th century	A house and attached barn in sandstone with a slate roof. The house has two storeys, two bays, and a rear extension. The windows are paired sashes with mullions. The doorway is between the bays and has a hood mould. The barn has a wide entrance with s segmental arch.
House west of Hipping Hall; 54.17674°N 2.54827°W	—	Late 17th century (probable)	A stone house with a slate roof in two storeys. It has two bays with a third bay set back to the right. In the upper floor is a painted sundial set diagonally. The original windows have been replaced.
Crow Trees and barn 54.18530°N 2.55232°W	—	1679	The house and barn are in stone with a slate roof, the barn having been added in the 18th century. The house is in two storeys with an attic. The doorway has a gabled porch, a moulded surround, and s shaped lintel inscribed with initials and the date. Most of the windows are mullioned. The barn has a wide entrance with a segmental arch.
Hipping Hall; 54.17681°N 2.54806°W	—	1706	A country house, mainly in sandstone, with a slate roof. It has three storeys, five bays, and a rear extension. Most of the windows are sashes, and there are the remains of mullioned windows in the extension. The central doorway has a porch carried on cast iron columns, and a moulded surround. Above it is a plaque carved with initials and the date.
High Leck Farmhouse; 54.18796°N 2.53558°W	—	Mid 18th century	The farmhouse is in sandstone with a slate roof, and has two storeys. The windows are mullioned, and the doorway has a gabled porch.
Longlands Farmhouse; 54.17788°N 2.55531°W	—	1754	A sandstone farmhouse with a slate roof in two storeys and two bays. The doorway has a gabled porch and a plain surround, and above it is an inscribed plaque. The windows no longer have their mullions.
Leck Hall; 54.18576°N 2.53473°W		1811	A country house by John Webb, in sandstone with a hipped slate roof. It has a symmetrical entrance south front with two storeys and five bays. In the centre of the front is a tetrastyle Ionic porch, and the windows are sashes. On the west front is a two-storey canted bay window.
Heber House; 54.18133°N 2.53559°W	—	Early 19th century	A sandstone house with a slate roof in two storeys and four bays. The doorway in the third bay has a plain surround and a Doric porch, and the windows are sashes.
High Lodge; 54.18219°N 2.54619°W	—	Early 19th century	A lodge to Leck Hall, it is in sandstone with a stone-slate roof, and in Jacobean style. It is in an L-shaped plan, and has two storeys. The doorway has plain jambs, a segmental arch, and a hood mould, and some of the windows are mullioned.
Wash house, Hipping Hall; 54.17688°N 2.54818°W	—	Early 19th century (probable)	An outbuilding in sandstone with a slate roof in a single storey. It has doorways leading to two separate compartments. The compartment on the right contains a stone bench. The other compartment is open to the rear, three stone steps lead to a flagged floor on two levels, and further steps lead down to a stream.
Cart shed, Leck Hall; 54.18603°N 2.53452°W	—	Early 19th century	A stone building with a slate roof in a single storey. There is a central gabled projection, and on each side is a doorway. The central projection has a central pier flanked by round arches.
Court house, Leck Hall; 54.18638°N 2.53475°W	—	Early 19th century	The building originated as stables, and is in sandstone with a hipped slate roof. There are two storeys and three bays. On the ground floor are three round-headed recessed arches; there are sash windows in the outer arches and in the upper floor.
Farm building, Leck Hall; 54.18625°N 2.53424°W	—	Early 19th century	The farm building is in sandstone with a hipped slate roof, and has two storeys. In the ground floor are three elliptical arches, and the upper storey is open at the front and rear. The main part is flanked by gabled wings, each with two elliptical arches.
Dovecote, Leck Hall; 54.18630°N 2.53456°W	—	Early 19th century	The dovecote is in stone with a slate roof. It consists of a central two-storey block with single-storey wings. The central block contains lunettes, and is surmounted by an octagonal lantern with access openings for birds, and a lead cap with a ball finial and a weathervane.
Orangery, Leck Hall; 54.18582°N 2.53580°W	—	Early 19th century	The orangery is in sandstone with a glass roof in a single storey. On the front are four round arches on Doric pilasters with glazed doors. On the right side is a round-headed doorway with an impost band.
Leck Hill House; 54.18655°N 2.54662°W	—	Early 19th century	A stone house with a hipped slate roof. It is in two storeys, and has a symmetrical front of three bays. There is a central timber Doric porch, and the windows are sashes.
Milestone; 54.17774°N 2.55189°W	—	Early 19th century (probable)	The milestone is in sandstone. It is inscribed with initials and indicates the distances in miles to Settle and to Kirkby Lonsdale.
Stone opposite High Lodge; 54.18237°N 2.54612°W	—	19th century	A stone in sandstone with a rectangular plan and a rounded top. It is inscribed with 'Shuttleworth. Gawthorpe', and is thought to have been a boundary stone moved from the Gawthorpe Hall estate.
Boundary stone 54.17940°N 2.56814°W	—	19th century	The stone marks the boundary between the parishes of Leck and Burrow-with-Burrow. It is in sandstone and has a roughly circular plan and a rounded top. It carries inscriptions, indicating the names of the parishes.
Boundary stone 54.18299°N 2.56008°W	—	Mid 19th century	The stone marks the boundary between the parishes of Leck and Burrow-with-Burrow. It is in sandstone, with a rectangular plan and a rounded top. It carries inscriptions, including the names of the parishes, and an arrow.
St Peter's Church; 54.18383°N 2.54846°W		1878–79	The church was designed by Paley and Austin, it was burnt in 1913, and replaced in its original design in 1915 by Austin, Paley and Austin. It is in sandstone with a slate roof, and consists of a nave, a north aisle, a south porch, a chancel with a north vestry, and west steeple. The steeple has a tower in two stages and has a west window with Perpendicular tracery and a solid parapet. The tower is surmounted by an octagonal recessed spire.
