= Judge Kay =

Judge Kay may refer to:

- Alan Kay (judge) (fl. 1950s–2020s), magistrate judge of the United States District Court for the District of Columbia
- Alan Cooke Kay (born 1932), judge of the United States District Court for the District of Hawaii
- Joseph Kay (economist) (1821–1878), judge on the Northern Circuit of England and Wales
- Maurice Kay (born 1942), judge of the Court of Appeal of England and Wales

== See also ==
- David Gregory Kays (born 1962), judge of the United States District Court for the Western District of Missouri
- Lord Justice Kay (disambiguation)
