= Lord Justice Kay =

Lord Justice Kay may refer to:

- Edward Ebenezer Kay (1822-1897)
- John Kay (judge) (1943-2004)
- Maurice Kay (born 1942)

== See also ==
- Judge Kay (disambiguation)
