= Shuttleworth Hall =

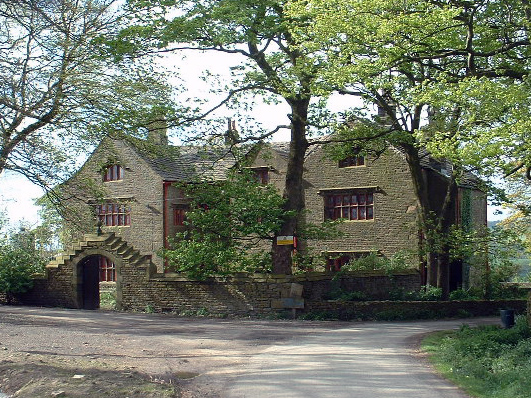
- Shuttleworth Hall from the front

- Location within the Borough of Burnley
- 53.7861°N 2.3296°W
- Location: Hapton, Lancashire

Listed Building – Grade I
- Official name: Shuttleworth Hall
- Designated: 1 April 1953

Listed Building – Grade II*
- Official name: Arched gateway and garden wall attached to south front of Shuttleworth Hall
- Designated: 12 February 1985

Shuttleworth Hall is a 17th-century manor house (and later farmhouse) in the civil parish of Hapton in Lancashire, England. It is protected as a Grade I listed building.

== History ==
The oldest part of the house dates from the early to mid-17th century. An inscription over the outer doorway to the porch contains the date of 1639. Although historians have supposed that the house was a residence of the Shuttleworth family of Gawthorpe Hall in Padiham, Shuttleworth Hall's connection to that branch of the family is unclear. By 1856, the building was described as a farmhouse, and it now consists of two separate dwellings. In April 1953, the house was designated a Grade I listed building. The Grade I listing is for buildings "of exceptional interest, sometimes considered to be internationally important". The garden wall and arched gateway are separately designated with a Grade II* listing.

== Architecture ==
The house is constructed of coursed rubble sandstone with roofs of stone slate. Its plan is H-shaped and it is built on two stories. Most of the windows have mullions and transoms; the hall windows are not mullioned. A garden to the south (front) of the house is enclosed by a wall with a segmental-arched gateway.

== See also ==
- Grade I listed buildings in Lancashire
- Listed buildings in Hapton, Lancashire
