= Edward Kay =

Edward Kay may refer to:

- Edward Kay (writer), Canadian writer
- Edward J. Kay (1898–1973), American film composer
- Edward Ebenezer Kay (1822–1897), British jurist
