= Baron Shuttleworth =

Barony in the Peerage of the United Kingdom

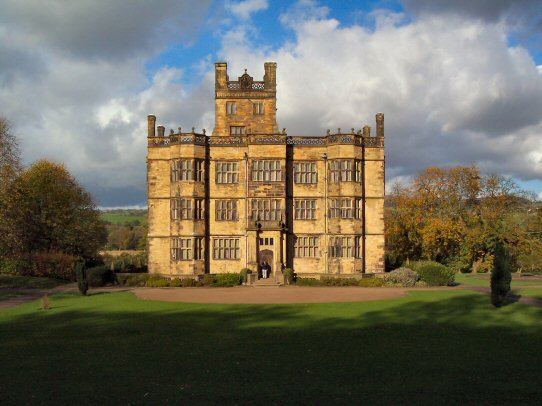
Gawthorpe Hall

Baron Shuttleworth, of Gawthorpe in the County Palatine of Lancaster, is a title in the Peerage of the United Kingdom. It was created on 15 July 1902 for the Liberal politician Sir Ughtred Kay-Shuttleworth, 2nd Baronet. Both his sons were killed in the First World War and he was therefore succeeded by his grandson, the second Baron (eldest son of Hon. Lawrence Ughtred Kay-Shuttleworth, eldest son of the first Baron). However, both he and his brother, the third Baron, were killed in action during the Second World War. On the death of the third Baron in 1942 the titles passed to his first cousin, the fourth Baron (eldest son of the Hon. Edward Kay-Shuttleworth, second son of the first Baron), who survived the Second World War although he was badly wounded. As of 2017 the titles are held by the latter's son, the fifth Baron, who succeeded in 1975. He had been Lord Lieutenant of Lancashire from 1997, to 2023.

The Kay-Shuttleworth Baronetcy, of Gawthorpe in the County Palatine of Lancaster, was created in the Baronetage of the United Kingdom in 1849 for the first Baronet, the physician, social reformer and educationalist James Kay-Shuttleworth. Born James Kay, he assumed by Royal licence the additional surname of Shuttleworth on his marriage in 1842 to Janet Shuttleworth, only child and heiress of Robert Shuttleworth of Gawthorpe Hall.

Two of the first Baronet's brothers also gained distinction. Joseph Kay was a noted economist while Sir Edward Kay was a Lord Justice of Appeal.

The family seat was Gawthorpe Hall at Padiham near Burnley, Lancashire. The house was sold by the family in 1970. It is now financed and run by the National Trust in partnership with Lancashire County Council. The present Baron lives at Leck Hall near Kirkby Lonsdale in north Lancashire.

== Kay-Shuttleworth Baronets, of Gawthorpe (1849) ==
Escutcheon of the Kay-Shuttleworth Baronets of Gawthorpe

- Sir James Phillips Kay-Shuttleworth, 1st Baronet (1804–1872)
- Sir Ughtred James Kay-Shuttleworth, 2nd Baronet (1844–1939) (created Baron Shuttleworth in 1902)

== Barons Shuttleworth (1902) ==
- Ughtred James Kay-Shuttleworth, 1st Baron Shuttleworth (1844–1939)
- Richard Ughtred Paul Kay-Shuttleworth, 2nd Baron Shuttleworth (1913–1940)
- Ronald Orlando Lawrence Kay-Shuttleworth, 3rd Baron Shuttleworth (1917–1942)
- Charles Ughtred John Kay-Shuttleworth, 4th Baron Shuttleworth (1917–1975)
- Charles Geoffrey Nicholas Kay-Shuttleworth, 5th Baron Shuttleworth (b. 1948)

The heir apparent is the present holder's son the Hon. Thomas Edward Kay-Shuttleworth (b. 1976)
