= Listed buildings in Pulham Market =

Historic structures in Norfolk, England

Pulham Market is a village and civil parish in the South Norfolk district of Norfolk, England. It contains 96 listed buildings that are recorded in the National Heritage List for England. Of these one is grade I, one is grade II* and 94 are grade II.

This list is based on the information retrieved online from Historic England.

== Key ==
Grade	Criteria
I	Buildings that are of exceptional interest
II*	Particularly important buildings of more than special interest
II	Buildings that are of special interest

== Listing ==
Name	Grade	Location	Type	Completed (Note: The date given is the date used by Historic England as significant for the initial building or that of an important part in the structure's description.)	Date designated	Grid ref. (Note: The grid reference is based on the British national grid reference system, sometimes known as OSGB36, used by the Ordnance Survey.) Geo-coordinates	Notes	Entry number (Note: The "List Entry Number" is a unique number assigned to each listed building and scheduled monument by Historic England.)	Image	Wikidata
Ashleigh Farmhouse	II				11 February 1977	TM1969289618; 52°27′37″N 1°13′56″E		1154618	Upload Photo	Q26447788
Bales' Farmhouse	II				11 February 1977	TM2095689133; 52°27′20″N 1°15′02″E		1050214	Upload Photo	Q26302200
Barn North of Elmtree Farmhouse	II				11 February 1977	TM2164188448; 52°26′56″N 1°15′37″E		1373299	Upload Photo	Q26654294
Elmtree Farmhouse	II				11 February 1977	TM2163088413; 52°26′55″N 1°15′36″E		1050213	Upload Photo	Q26302199
Foxholes Farmhouse	II				11 February 1977	TM2048288582; 52°27′02″N 1°14′36″E		1050212	Upload Photo	Q26302198
French's Farmhouse	II				11 February 1977	TM1957589504; 52°27′34″N 1°13′50″E		1050252	Upload Photo	Q26302239
Manor Farmhouse	II*		farmhouse		11 September 1951	TM2110988467; 52°26′58″N 1°15′09″E		1373298	Manor Farmhouse More images	Q12061473
Parish Farmhouse	II				11 February 1977	TM1987188957; 52°27′15″N 1°14′04″E		1050253	Upload Photo	Q26302240
Rookery Farmhouse	II				11 February 1977	TM1892787203; 52°26′20″N 1°13′10″E		1050215	Upload Photo	Q26302201
Stables Immediately in Front (south-east) of Rookery Farmhouse	II				11 February 1977	TM1893987190; 52°26′20″N 1°13′11″E		1373300	Upload Photo	Q26654295
Walnut Farmhouse	II				11 February 1977	TM1987288918; 52°27′14″N 1°14′04″E		1050210	Upload Photo	Q26302196
Wood Farmhouse	II				11 February 1977	TM1994689382; 52°27′29″N 1°14′09″E		1154630	Upload Photo	Q26447806
Hill House	II	(south Norfolk District Council Offices)			11 February 1977	TM1861587537; 52°26′31″N 1°12′55″E		1050216	Upload Photo	Q26302202
The Homestead	II	Back Of The Inns			11 February 1977	TM1976986246; 52°25′48″N 1°13′52″E		1373301	Upload Photo	Q26654296
Tile Curatage	II	Back Of The Inns			11 February 1977	TM1977786228; 52°25′47″N 1°13′53″E		1303660	Upload Photo	Q26590707
Cottages	II	1 and 2, Bank Street			11 February 1977	TM1965086299; 52°25′50″N 1°13′46″E		1154829	Upload Photo	Q26448081
Andrews	II	Bank Street			11 February 1977	TM1965786346; 52°25′51″N 1°13′47″E		1154821	Upload Photo	Q26448070
Goodwin House, Rose Cottage and Japonica Cottage	II	Bank Street			7 December 1959	TM1970186306; 52°25′50″N 1°13′49″E		1050217	Upload Photo	Q26302203
Melrose Cottage	II	Bank Street			11 February 1977	TM1965686281; 52°25′49″N 1°13′47″E		1050218	Upload Photo	Q26302204
Post Office	II	Bank Street			11 February 1977	TM1970786273; 52°25′49″N 1°13′49″E		1303662	Upload Photo	Q26590709
Premises of Smith and Son	II	Bank Street			11 February 1977	TM1963486319; 52°25′51″N 1°13′46″E		1050219	Upload Photo	Q26302205
White House	II	Bank Street			11 February 1977	TM1961386365; 52°25′52″N 1°13′45″E		1373302	Upload Photo	Q26654297
Thatched Cottage	II	Barnes Road			4 March 1974	TM1977686173; 52°25′46″N 1°13′53″E		1050221	Upload Photo	Q26302207
Houses Occupied by D Crow and J Allen	II	Barnes's Lane			11 February 1977	TM1977786290; 52°25′49″N 1°13′53″E		1373304	Upload Photo	Q26654299
Itll Do	II	Barnes's Lane			11 February 1977	TM1975186277; 52°25′49″N 1°13′52″E		1303627	Upload Photo	Q26590676
Knotty Kot	II	Barnes's Lane			11 February 1977	TM1971686284; 52°25′49″N 1°13′50″E		1154832	Upload Photo	Q26448085
Pair of Cottages Immediately West of Itll Do	II	Barnes's Lane			11 February 1977	TM1973986282; 52°25′49″N 1°13′51″E		1373303	Upload Photo	Q26654298
Prospect House	II	Barnes's Lane			11 February 1977	TM1978386305; 52°25′50″N 1°13′53″E		1154865	Upload Photo	Q26448131
Sunnyside and Adjoining Cottage to West	II	Barnes's Lane			11 February 1977	TM1979586282; 52°25′49″N 1°13′54″E		1154873	Upload Photo	Q26448139
The Harrow	II	Barnes's Lane			11 February 1977	TM1975286356; 52°25′52″N 1°13′52″E		1050220	Upload Photo	Q26302206
Blackthorn Farmhouse	II	Bush Green			11 February 1977	TM2118887749; 52°26′34″N 1°15′11″E		1154884	Upload Photo	Q26448150
Bush Green Farmhouse	II	Bush Green			11 February 1977	TM2103887698; 52°26′33″N 1°15′03″E		1154878	Upload Photo	Q26448144
Duck's Foot House	II	Bush Green			11 February 1977	TM2062887836; 52°26′38″N 1°14′42″E		1303602	Upload Photo	Q26590653
Fair View	II	Bush Green			11 February 1977	TM2106687813; 52°26′37″N 1°15′05″E		1050223	Upload Photo	Q26302209
Glenrose	II	Bush Green			11 February 1977	TM2060887850; 52°26′39″N 1°14′41″E		1050222	Upload Photo	Q26302208
Orchard Farmhouse and Barn Adjoining to East	II	Bush Green			11 February 1977	TM2069287835; 52°26′38″N 1°14′45″E		1373305	Upload Photo	Q26654300
Glen House	II	Church Walk			11 February 1977	TM1973886269; 52°25′49″N 1°13′51″E		1303607	Upload Photo	Q26590657
The Old Bakery Restaurant	II	Church Walk			11 February 1977	TM1974286234; 52°25′48″N 1°13′51″E		1373306	Upload Photo	Q26654301
Wayside and Chamusca	II	Church Walk			11 February 1977	TM1971886269; 52°25′49″N 1°13′50″E		1050224	Upload Photo	Q26302210
Fortunes Well	II	Colegate End			11 February 1977	TM1947287900; 52°26′42″N 1°13′41″E		1154903	Upload Photo	Q26448169
House North-west of the Lodge	II	Colegate End			11 February 1977	TM1935587966; 52°26′44″N 1°13′35″E		1373307	Upload Photo	Q26654302
Sunnyside	II	Colegate End			11 February 1977	TM1943187947; 52°26′43″N 1°13′39″E		1050225	Upload Photo	Q26302211
Tally Ho and Adjoining Cottage to West	II	Colegate End			11 February 1977	TM1947887880; 52°26′41″N 1°13′41″E		1050226	Upload Photo	Q26302212
The Lodge	II	Colegate End			11 February 1977	TM1936687906; 52°26′42″N 1°13′35″E		1154896	Upload Photo	Q26448162
The Swallows	II	Colegate End			11 February 1977	TM1960087856; 52°26′40″N 1°13′47″E		1154993	Upload Photo	Q26448252
Barn Immediately South of Grange Farmhouse	II	Colegate End Road			11 February 1977	TM1972086818; 52°26′07″N 1°13′51″E		1154999	Upload Photo	Q26448260
Briar Cottage and Cobwebs	II	Colegate End Road			11 February 1977	TM1959186593; 52°25′59″N 1°13′44″E		1303541	Upload Photo	Q26590600
Chesnut Farmhouse	II	Colegate End Road			11 February 1977	TM1958386678; 52°26′02″N 1°13′44″E		1154994	Upload Photo	Q26448254
Falkland House	II	Colegate End Road			11 February 1977	TM1961486737; 52°26′04″N 1°13′45″E		1050228	Upload Photo	Q26302214
Grange Farm Cottage	II	Colegate End Road			11 February 1977	TM1973686918; 52°26′10″N 1°13′52″E		1050231	Upload Photo	Q26302217
Grange Farmhouse	II	Colegate End Road			11 February 1977	TM1972286852; 52°26′08″N 1°13′51″E		1050230	Upload Photo	Q26302216
Point House	II	Colegate End Road			11 February 1977	TM1953886377; 52°25′53″N 1°13′41″E		1050227	Upload Photo	Q26302213
The Elms	II	Colegate End Road			11 February 1977	TM1974687052; 52°26′14″N 1°13′53″E		1050188	Upload Photo	Q26302173
Barn North of the Oaks	II	Common Road, IP21 4XT			11 February 1977	TM2014388618; 52°27′04″N 1°14′18″E		1050211	Upload Photo	Q26302197
The Oaks	II	Common Road, IP21 4XT			11 February 1977	TM2013588586; 52°27′03″N 1°14′17″E		1373297	Upload Photo	Q26654293
Mill Lane Farmhouse	II	Dunnings Lane			11 February 1977	TM1922287222; 52°26′20″N 1°13′26″E		1373326	Upload Photo	Q26654321
1 and 2, Guildhall Lane	II	1 and 2, Guildhall Lane			11 February 1977	TM1963086128; 52°25′44″N 1°13′45″E		1155042	Upload Photo	Q26448321
Ducksfoot Farmhouse	II	Hardwick Road, Bush Green			20 August 1991	TM2074488029; 52°26′44″N 1°14′48″E		1252707	Upload Photo	Q26544543
Tarabb	II	1, Harleston Road			11 February 1977	TM1978786102; 52°25′43″N 1°13′53″E		1373331	Upload Photo	Q26654326
2 and 3, Harleston Road	II	2 and 3, Harleston Road			11 February 1977	TM1979586099; 52°25′43″N 1°13′54″E		1155045	Upload Photo	Q26448325
4-8, Harleston Road	II	4-8, Harleston Road			11 February 1977	TM1980986092; 52°25′43″N 1°13′54″E		1050196	Upload Photo	Q26302181
Barn North-east of Julian House	II	Julian Road			11 February 1977	TM1866986932; 52°26′12″N 1°12′56″E		1050197	Upload Photo	Q26302182
Julian House	II	Julian Road			11 February 1977	TM1865586914; 52°26′11″N 1°12′55″E		1155064	Upload Photo	Q26448353
Cottage Immediately East of Limetree Farmhouse	II	Market Stony Lane Colegate End			11 February 1977	TM1925588299; 52°26′55″N 1°13′30″E		1303463	Upload Photo	Q26590533
Barn Immediately South-west of Hill Farmhouse	II	Poppy's Lane			11 February 1977	TM2061086897; 52°26′08″N 1°14′38″E		1050198	Upload Photo	Q26302184
Barn Immediately West of Hill Farmhouse	II	Poppy's Lane			11 February 1977	TM2059086906; 52°26′08″N 1°14′37″E		1155094	Upload Photo	Q26448396
Hill Farmhouse	II	Poppy's Lane			11 February 1977	TM2063786910; 52°26′08″N 1°14′40″E		1155078	Upload Photo	Q26448372
Lands Farmhouse	II	Poppy's Lane			11 February 1977	TM2058187266; 52°26′20″N 1°14′38″E		1373332	Upload Photo	Q26654327
Semere Green Cottage	II	6, Semere Green			11 February 1977	TM1885984954; 52°25′08″N 1°13′01″E		1303510	Upload Photo	Q26590573
Baithentwaits Farmhouse	II	Semere Green			11 February 1977	TM1893284988; 52°25′09″N 1°13′05″E		1373293	Upload Photo	Q26654289
Gresham's Farmhouse	II	Semere Green			11 February 1977	TM1861384874; 52°25′05″N 1°12′48″E		1050199	Upload Photo	Q26302185
Barn Immediately East of Gothic House	II	Station Road			11 February 1977	TM1901985144; 52°25′13″N 1°13′10″E		1155131	Upload Photo	Q26448450
Bridge Farmhouse	II	Station Road			11 February 1977	TM1932885653; 52°25′29″N 1°13′28″E		1373294	Upload Photo	Q26654290
Church Croft Including Adjoining Outbuilding to South	II	Station Road			11 February 1977	TM1965486044; 52°25′42″N 1°13′46″E		1155126	Upload Photo	Q26448442
Gothic House	II	Station Road			11 February 1977	TM1898985140; 52°25′13″N 1°13′09″E		1050200	Upload Photo	Q26302186
Hillside Cottage	II	Station Road			11 February 1977	TM1957585979; 52°25′40″N 1°13′42″E		1050201	Upload Photo	Q26302187
The Beeches and Garden Wall in Front	II	Station Road			11 February 1977	TM1930185712; 52°25′31″N 1°13′26″E		1373295	Upload Photo	Q26654291
The Hall	II	Station Road			11 September 1951	TM1889885762; 52°25′34″N 1°13′05″E		1155150	Upload Photo	Q26448476
Walnut Cottage	II	Station Road			11 February 1977	TM1950285885; 52°25′37″N 1°13′38″E		1155142	Upload Photo	Q26448466
Low Farmhouse	II	Stony Lane Colegate End			11 February 1977	TM1917188422; 52°26′59″N 1°13′26″E		1050202	Upload Photo	Q26302188
Allotments Cottage	II	Tattlepot Road			8 May 1973	TM1953486342; 52°25′51″N 1°13′40″E		1373296	Upload Photo	Q26654292
Sycamore Farmhouse	II	Tattlepot Road			11 February 1977	TM1937786398; 52°25′53″N 1°13′32″E		1155169	Upload Photo	Q26448500
Tattlepot Farmhouse	II	Tattlepot Road			11 February 1977	TM1921586496; 52°25′57″N 1°13′24″E		1050203	Upload Photo	Q26302189
Central Stores and Adjoining House to North	II	The Green			11 February 1977	TM1968986202; 52°25′47″N 1°13′48″E		1373329	Upload Photo	Q26654324
Chestnut Cottage	II	The Green			11 February 1977	TM1969086215; 52°25′47″N 1°13′48″E		1050192	Upload Photo	Q26302177
Church of St Mary Magdalene	I	The Green	church building		7 December 1959	TM1970186076; 52°25′43″N 1°13′48″E		1155029	Church of St Mary Magdalene More images	Q17537586
Churchyard Wall West of Church of St Mary Magdalene	II	The Green			11 February 1977	TM1967186091; 52°25′43″N 1°13′47″E		1373330	Upload Photo	Q26654325
Drayton House and Little Drayton	II	The Green			11 February 1977	TM1976486120; 52°25′44″N 1°13′52″E		1050189	Upload Photo	Q26302174
Falcon Inn	II	The Green	pub		11 February 1977	TM1972086219; 52°25′47″N 1°13′50″E		1373328	Falcon Inn More images	Q26654323
Forge Cottage	II	The Green			11 February 1977	TM1977786165; 52°25′45″N 1°13′53″E		1373327	Upload Photo	Q26654322
Goodings the Thatched Cottage	II	The Green			11 February 1977	TM1977586190; 52°25′46″N 1°13′53″E		1050191	Upload Photo	Q26302176
Kingsmuir	II	The Green			11 February 1977	TM1977586148; 52°25′45″N 1°13′53″E		1050190	Upload Photo	Q26302175
Stables South-west of the Old Rectory	II	The Green			11 February 1977	TM1973486036; 52°25′41″N 1°13′50″E		1050195	Upload Photo	Q26302180
The Crown Inn	II	The Green	pub		11 September 1951	TM1971286124; 52°25′44″N 1°13′49″E		1050194	The Crown Inn More images	Q26302179
The Laurels	II	The Green			11 September 1974	TM1968386151; 52°25′45″N 1°13′48″E		1050193	Upload Photo	Q26302178
The Old Rectory	II	The Green			11 February 1977	TM1975986066; 52°25′42″N 1°13′52″E		1155039	Upload Photo	Q26448316

== See also ==
- Grade I listed buildings in Norfolk
- Grade II* listed buildings in Norfolk

== Sources ==
- Wilson, Bill; Pevsner, Nikolaus (1999) [1962], Norfolk 2: North-West and South, The Buildings of England, New Haven and London: Yale University Press, ISBN 978-0-300-09657-6
