= Ronald Kay-Shuttleworth, 3rd Baron Shuttleworth =

Ronald Orlando Lawrence Kay-Shuttleworth, 3rd Baron Shuttleworth (7 October 1917– 17 November 1942) was a British Army officer who was briefly a peer, landowner, and a member of the House of Lords from 1941 until his death in the Second World War.

== Biography ==
Shuttleworth was the second and posthumous son of Capt. Lawrence Ughtred Kay-Shuttleworth, the eldest son of 1st Baron Shuttleworth, and his wife, Selina Adine Bridgeman. His father was killed in action at Vimy Ridge in March 1917 in the First World War; his father's younger brother, Capt. Edward Kay-Shuttleworth, was killed just four months later, in July 1917.

His mother, Selina Adine Bridgeman, was the daughter of Hon. Francis Bridgeman, M.P., and the granddaughter of the 3rd Earl of Bradford. Diplomat Reginald Bridgeman was his uncle. In 1920, his mother remarried to Canadian Brig.-Gen. William Birchall Macaulay King.

He was educated at Eton College and Balliol College, Oxford.

In 1940, his elder brother, Flying Officer Richard Kay-Shuttleworth, 2nd Baron Shuttleworth, was killed in action while serving with the Royal Air Force, just eight months after he had inherited the barony from their grandfather. He went missing in 1940 while flying over the English Channel; he was declared dead in March 1941. Ronald succeeded his brother as Baron Shuttleworth, of Gawthorpe (created 1902), and also to a baronetcy created in 1849, and inherited the Gawthorpe Hall estate at Ightenhill.

Shuttleworth was commissioned into the Royal Artillery and fought in the North African campaign. In November 1942, he was killed in action while serving with the 138th Field Regiment. He is buried at Tabarka Ras Rajel War Cemetery in Tunisia.
