= Leck Hall =

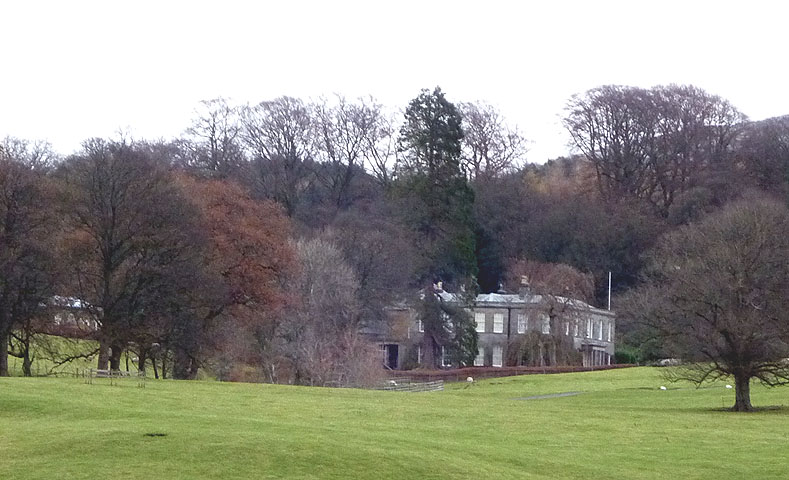

- Location within the City of Lancaster district

General information
- Type: Country house
- Location: Leck, Lancashire, England
- Coordinates: 54.1858°N 2.5348°W
- Opened: 1811
- Owner: Charles Kay-Shuttleworth

Technical details
- Material: Sandstone ashlar with hipped slate roof
- Floor count: 2

Design and construction
- Architect: John Webb

Listed Building – Grade II
- Designated: 4 October 1967
- Reference no.: 1164984

Listed Building – Grade II
- Official name: Orangery west of Leck Hall
- Designated: 4 October 1967
- Reference no.: 1071666

Leck Hall is an 18th-century country house located at Leck, Lancashire, England, near Kirkby Lonsdale.

The hall is grade II listed and stands in an informal park with an orangery nearby. Home farm, late 18th century, is close to the house and there is a Lodge at the entrance to the drive.

It is the current seat of Baron Shuttleworth, of Gawthorpe Hall, Padiham in the County Palatine of Lancaster (Lancashire) and is not open to the public.

== History ==
Robert Welch, a Liverpool merchant who lived at High House, Leck, bought the Thurland Castle estate in 1771, but his son Robert sold all of the land but the part which is now the Leck estate. On Robert's death his brother George had architect John Carr design and build a new house to replace High House, which was afterwards called Leck Hall. It was altered in 1830 and again in 1963.

The estate was purchased in 1952 by Charles Kay-Shuttleworth, 4th Baron Shuttleworth who moved there from Gawthorpe Hall in 1970. The current owner is his son Charles Kay-Shuttleworth, 5th Baron Shuttleworth.

== See also ==
- Listed buildings in Leck, Lancashire
