= Thorpe Abbotts =

Village in Norfolk, England

Coordinates: 52.37183°N 1.2212°E

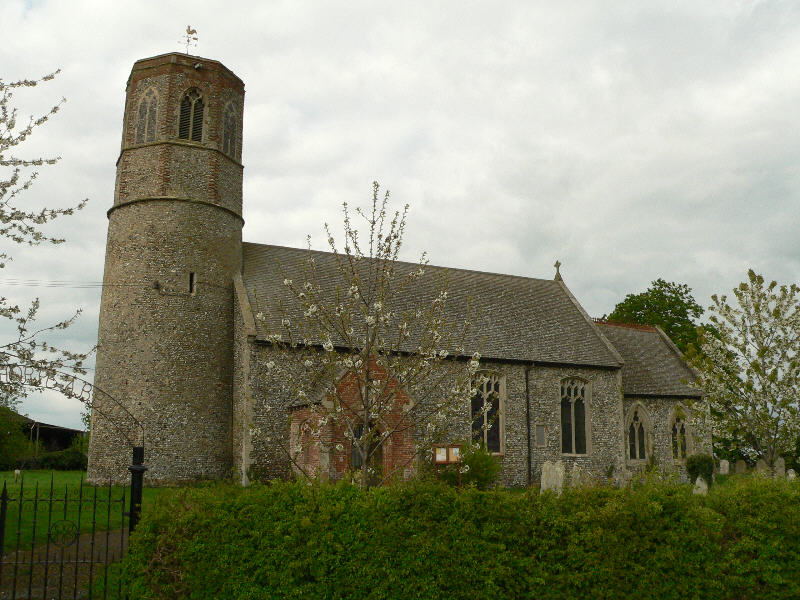
- The parish church of All Saints, Thorpe Abbots, Norfolk

- Location within Norfolk
- OS grid reference: TM190790
  - London: 106 miles (171 km)
- Civil parish: Brockdish
- District: South Norfolk
- Shire county: Norfolk
- Region: East
- Country: England
- Sovereign state: United Kingdom
- Post town: DISS
- Postcode district: IP21
- Dialling code: 01379
- Police: Norfolk
- Fire: Norfolk
- Ambulance: East of England

Thorpe Abbotts is a village and (as Thorpe Abbots) a former civil parish, now in the parish of Brockdish, in the South Norfolk district, in the county of Norfolk, England. The village is 6.5 miles (10.5 km) east of Diss, 20.8 miles (33.5 km) south south west of Norwich and 106 miles (171 km) north east of London. The village lies .4 miles (0.64 km) north of the A143 Diss to Great Yarmouth road. The nearest railway station is at Diss for the Great Eastern Main Line which runs between Norwich and Liverpool Street station, London. The nearest airport is Norwich International Airport. In 1931 the parish had a population of 170.

== History ==
The villages name means 'abbot's outlying farm/settlement'.

Thorpe Abbotts has an entry in the Domesday Book of 1085. In the great book, Thorpe Abbotts is recorded by the name Thorp and is said to be King's land, in the charge of William de Noyers.

On 1 April 1935 the parish was abolished and merged with Brockdish.

=== Station 139 ===
During the Second World War, Thorpe Abbotts became home to RAF Station Thorpe Abbotts with the designation 139, Thorpe Abbotts. The airfield was built in 1942 by John Laing & Sons Ltd. The airfield had three intersecting runways laid with concrete which were encircled by a three and a half mile perimeter road. The perimeter road had hard standings for fifty aircraft. There were two hangars, a technical site and a domestic area. The station became operational in June 1943 when the 100th Bomb Group of the United States Army Air Forces took up residency equipped with the Boeing B-17 Flying Fortress. The group became known as the ‘’Bloody 100th’’ because of the heavy losses incurred by the group on a number of their combat missions. The 100th were the only group to fly operations from Thorpe Abbots and during a period between 15 June 1943 and 10 April 1945, 306 missions were flown from the airfield. The USAAF left the station in December 1945 when the airfield was returned to the RAF and it remained inactive until April 1956 when the airfield was finally closed (de-requisitioned).

The land owned by Sir Rupert Mann has been returned to agricultural use but the perimeter road remained intact until 1986 when it was demolished. Some of the buildings including the control tower still survive. Today the old control tower has been fully restored and contains a museum dedicated to the famous 'Bloody Hundredth' Bomb Group. The museum tells the story of Thorpe Abbotts and portrays every-day life on an American bomber base. A D-4 link trainer is on display, while a B-24 tail turret is undergoing restoration. Special events and reunions are frequently staged.

=== Eddie the Ghost ===
From time to time, visitors to the museum report an overpowering presence within the control tower, occasionally accompanied by the brief glimpse of an airman dressed in full flying gear. The sound of VHF chatter and the sound of aircraft have also been heard. These strange apparitions are not a new phenomenon. "Eddie the Ghost", as American personnel nicknamed him, began to appear after the first Berlin raids by the RAF's Bomber Command, with "Eddie's" apparitions noted as happening from 1942; he was reported as walking through walls of the airmen's quarters. Stories of the ghost persisted with some of the men taking their carbines to bed with them. Fearing an accident, Colonel Jeffrey, the station (base) commander, forbade all talk of Eddie on penalty of court martial. Today, sightings are less frequently recorded although Eddie is occasionally seen when the tower is locked at night. He appears at the first-floor window looking out as if to say good night.

== Gallery ==
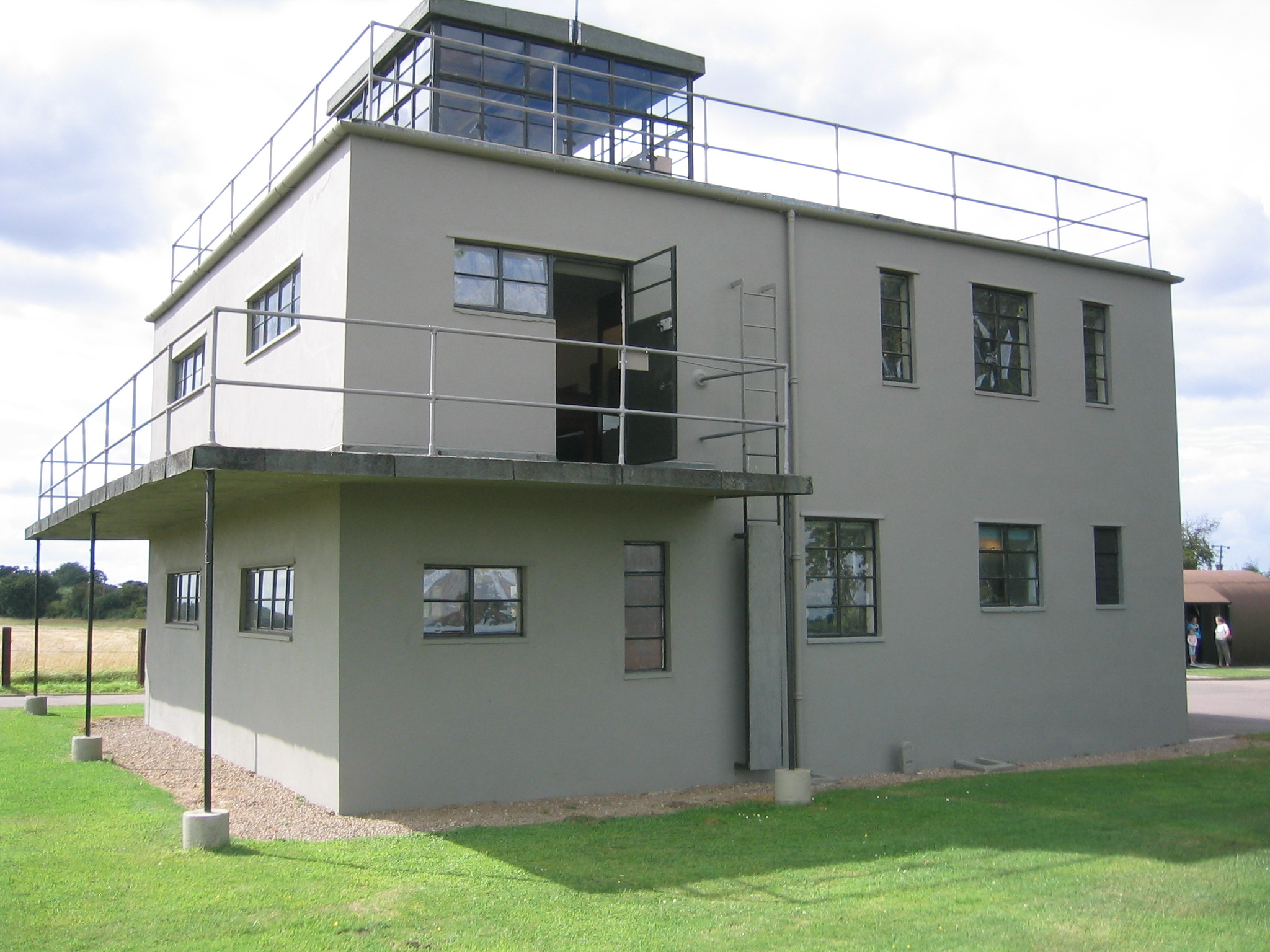
The restored control tower

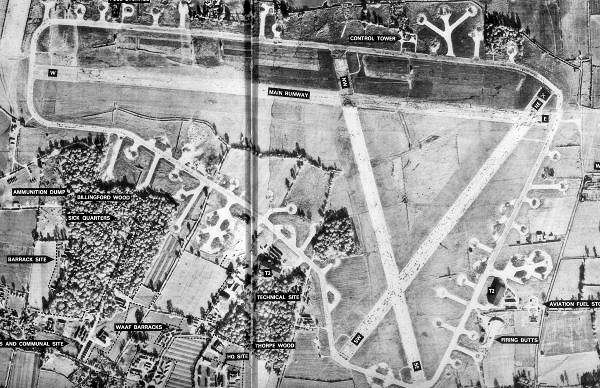
Thorpe Abbots Airfield - 13 November 1946

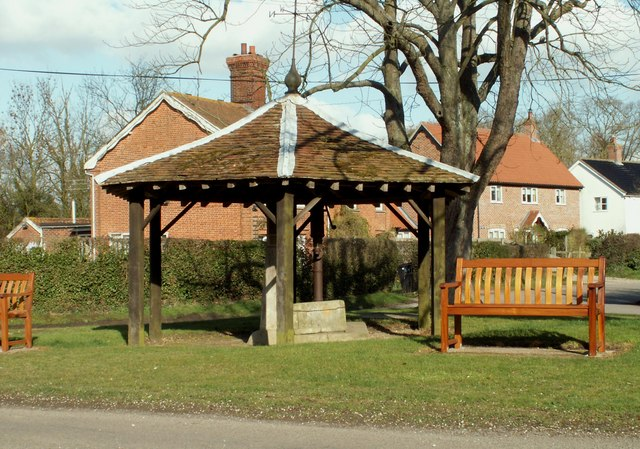
The Village Pump

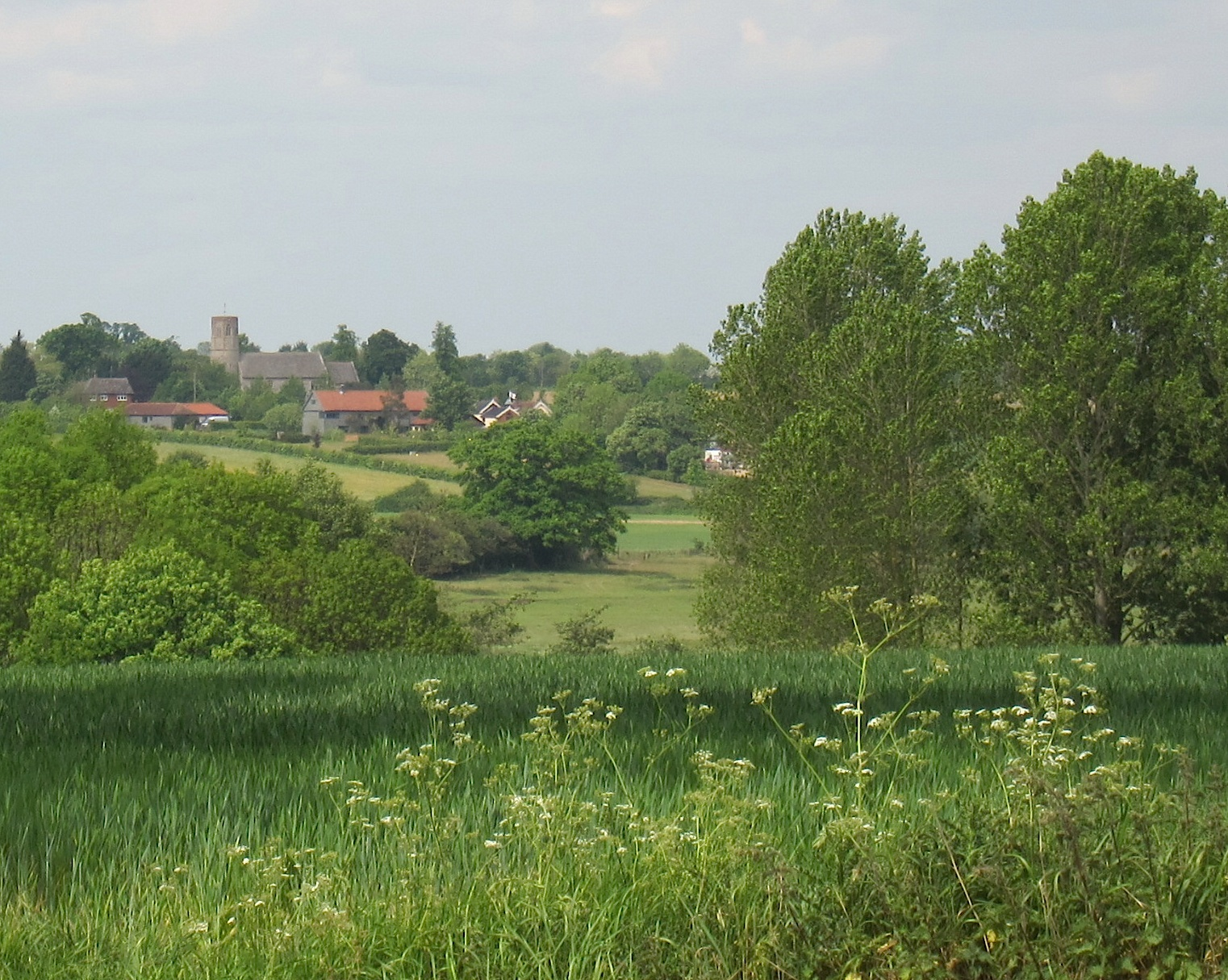
Thorpe Abbotts, with All Saints, from s. across Waveney valley

== All Saints parish church ==
All Saints parish church is one of 124 existing round-tower churches in Norfolk. The church was almost entirely refurbished in the 19th century but still possess its medieval font and screen. The church is a Grade I listed building .

== Village pump ==
The village hand pump was installed by Lord Justice Kay in 1867 and has a wooden canopy placed over it. The pump has undergone several restorations - in 1924 by a local doctor and, more recently, by the villagers in 1979.
