= Brockdish =

Village in Norfolk, England

Coordinates: 52.370°N 1.247°E

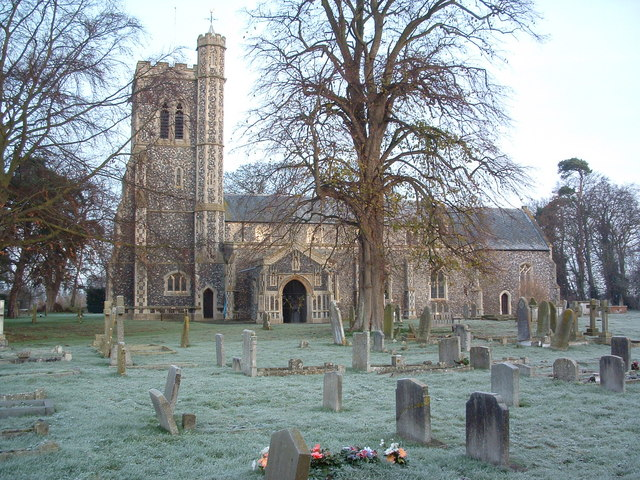
- Church of St. Peter and St. Paul

- Location within Norfolk
- Area: 9.15 km^{2} (3.53 sq mi)
- Population: 699
  - Density: 76/km^{2} (200/sq mi)
- OS grid reference: TM224794
- Civil parish: Brockdish
- District: South Norfolk
- Shire county: Norfolk
- Region: East
- Country: England
- Sovereign state: United Kingdom
- Post town: DISS
- Postcode district: IP21
- Dialling code: 01379
- Police: Norfolk
- Fire: Norfolk
- Ambulance: East of England
- UK Parliament: Waveney Valley

Brockdish is a village and civil parish in the south of the English county of Norfolk. It is 3.3 miles (5.3 km) south-west of Harleston and 18 miles (29 km) south of Norwich. The parish includes Thorpe Abbotts. The River Waveney, which marks the county border with Suffolk, is the southern boundary of the parish, with Brockdish the highest point where the river is navigable by small watercraft.

In the Domesday Book, Brockdish is recorded as a settlement of 39 households in the hundred of Earsham. In 1086, the village was divided between the estates of William the Conqueror and Bury St Edmunds Abbey.

At the 2021 census, the parish had a population of 699, a slight increase from the 2011 census.

== Church of St. Peter and St. Paul ==
Brockdish's parish church is dedicated to both Saint Peter and Saint Paul and was constructed in the 11th century. The building is Grade I listed. The church was significantly remodelled in the 1860s at the expense of Rector George France and under the supervision of Frederick Marrable. The church has a collection of stained-glass windows, mostly from the workshops of J. & J. King of Norwich.

== Amenities ==
Brockdish originally had two public houses until the closure of 'The Greyhound' in 2000, leaving the remaining pub: 'The King's Head'.

Brockdish Primary School closed in 2016 due to falling pupil numbers. At one point it was Norfolk's smallest primary school. Pupils today attend primary education in Pulham Market or Harleston. Today, the school building is used as the Waveney Heritage Centre, a charity dedicated to forwarding local history. Pupils usually pursue secondary education at Harleston Sancroft Academy.

== Notable people ==
- Clementia Taylor (1810–1908), Suffragist who was born in Brockdish.
- Baroness Elaine Murphy (b.1947), Politician who lives in Brockdish, and has written a number of books about the area.
