= Listed buildings in Hapton, Lancashire =

Hapton is a civil parish in the borough of Burnley, Lancashire, England. The parish contains seven buildings that are recorded in the National Heritage List for England as designated listed buildings. Of these, one is listed at Grade I, the highest of the three grades, one at Grade II*, the middle grade, and the others are at Grade II, the lowest grade. Apart from the village of Hapton, and some industrial encroachment from Burnley to the northeast the parish is rural. Three of the listed buildings are or have been farmhouses. The most notable building in the parish is Shuttleworth Hall; this together with associated structures, is listed. The Leeds and Liverpool Canal passes through the parish, and two of the bridges crossing it are listed.

== Key ==
Grade	Criteria
I	Buildings of exceptional interest, sometimes considered to be internationally important
II*	Particularly important buildings of more than special interest
II	Buildings of national importance and special interest

== Buildings ==
Name and location	Photograph	Date	Notes	Grade
Shuttleworth Hall; 53.78612°N 2.32968°W		17th century	A mansion, altered in 1909, built in sandstone with stone-slate roofs. It has an H-shaped plan, with a hall of two bays and wings of three bays. There are 2 1/2 storeys and a porch in the angle of the right wing. All the windows are mullioned and those on the front of the hall are also transomed.	I
Gateway and wall, Shuttleworth Hall; 53.78591°N 2.32969°W	—	17th century	The wall around the garden in front of the hall, and the arched gateway are in sandstone. The wall is about 1.5 metres (4.9 ft) high, and surrounds three sides of the garden. The gateway consists of a moulded segmental-headed gateway with a crow-stepped parapet and a ball finial, and it contains a wooden door with ornamental iron hinges.	II*
Watson Laithe Farmhouse and barn 53.77535°N 2.29040°W		17th century	The farmhouse and attached barn are in sandstone, the house having a stone-slate roof, and the barn with a corrugated metal roof. The house has two storeys and two bays, and most of the windows are mullioned. The barn has four bays, and contains a wagon entrance, windows, ventilation holes, and a loading door. The gable of the house over the barn has a coping with four carved motifs.	II
Farmhouse and barn, New Barn Farm; 53.76953°N 2.28905°W		c. 1700	The farmhouse, now disused, and the barn are in sandstone with stone-slate roofs, the house facing south and the barn forming a wing to the west. The house is in two storeys and three bays, and has mullioned windows. The barn has an H-shaped plan with a wagon entrance and outshuts.	II
Hapton Hall Farmhouse; 53.77819°N 2.31953°W	—	1710	A sandstone farmhouse, partly rendered, with a slate roof. It has two storeys and three bays, with a cottage added later to the south. There is a symmetrical front with a central doorway, and the windows have been altered, most of them being top-hung casements.	II
Canal Bridge No. 121; 53.78435°N 2.31425°W		c. 1800	The bridge, also known as Hapton Bridge, carries Manchester Road over the Leeds and Liverpool Canal. It is in sandstone and consists of a single elliptical arch with rusticated voussoirs, a slightly humped parapet with flat coping, and with pilasters at the ends.	II
Knotts Bridge; 53.78580°N 2.29970°W		c. 1800	The bridge, No. 123, is an accommodation bridge crossing the Leeds and Liverpool Canal. It is in sandstone and consists of a single elliptical arch with rusticated voussoirs, a slightly humped parapet with flat coping, and with pilasters at the ends.	II
