= Richard Kay-Shuttleworth, 2nd Baron Shuttleworth =

The Right Honourable The Lord Shuttleworth CC

Member of the House of Lords
- Lord Temporal
- Hereditary peerage 20 December 1939 – 8 August 1940
- Preceded by: The 1st Baron Shuttleworth
- Succeeded by: The 3rd Baron Shuttleworth

Personal details
- Born: The Hon. Richard Ughtred Paul Kay-Shuttleworth; 30 October 1913
- Died: 8 August 1940 (aged 26)
- Parent: Lawrence Ughtred Kay-Shuttleworth (father)
- Education: Eton College; Balliol College, Oxford
- Occupation: Flying officer
- Known for: British peer and air force officer

Richard Ughtred Paul Kay-Shuttleworth, 2nd Baron Shuttleworth (30 October 1913 – 8 August 1940) was a British officer of the Royal Air Force, peer, and landowner, and a member of the House of Lords from 1939 until his death eight months later.

Shuttleworth was the elder son of Capt. Lawrence Ughtred Kay-Shuttleworth; his father was the eldest son of Ughtred Kay-Shuttleworth, 1st Baron Shuttleworth and his wife Selina Adine Bridgeman. His father was killed in action during the First World War. He was educated at Eton College and Balliol College, Oxford, where he graduated with a Bachelor of Arts (BA) degree.

Elected as a member of Lancashire County Council in 1937, Shuttleworth also became a Justice of the Peace for the county and was commissioned as a Flying Officer into the Royal Air Force Volunteer Reserve. On 20 December 1939, he succeeded his grandfather as the 2nd Baron Shuttleworth, of Gawthorpe (created 1902), and also to a baronetcy created in 1849, and inherited the Gawthorpe Hall estate at Ightenhill.

Shuttleworth fought in the Battle of Britain and in August 1940 was killed in action during air operations which formed part of it, when his Hawker Hurricane went missing during a battle over a convoy in the English Channel, south of the Isle of Wight.
