= Rachel Kay-Shuttleworth =

English textile collector and Girl Guiding pioneer (1886–1967)

Rachel Kay-Shuttleworth MBE
- Born: Rachel Beatrice Kay-Shuttleworth; 17 February 1886
- Died: 20 April 1967 (aged 81); Gawthorpe Hall, Padiham, England
- Occupation(s): Embroiderer; Textile collector Girl Guide leader

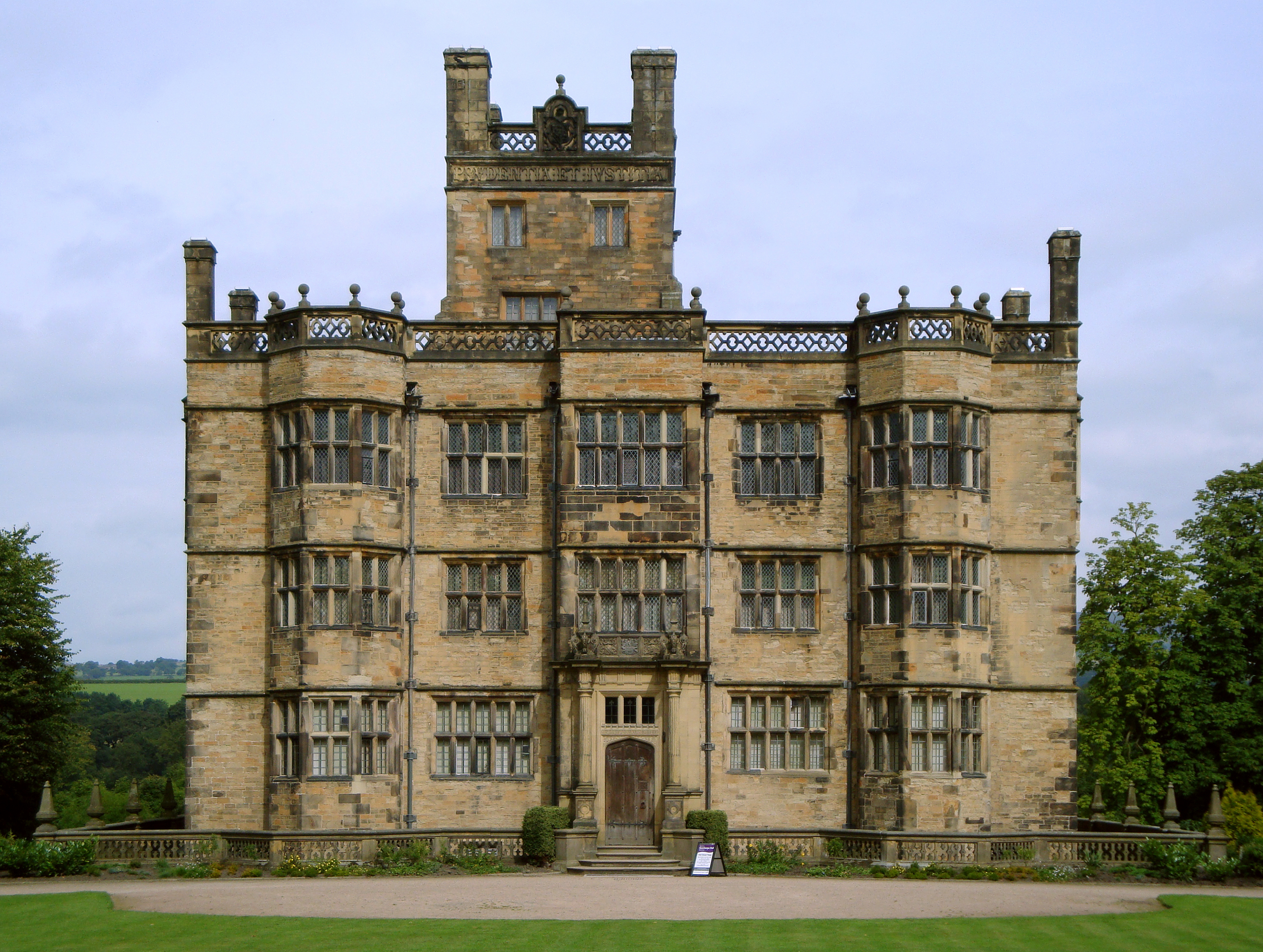
Gawthorpe Hall, Kay-Shuttleworth's home where her textile collection is now displayed

The Hon. Rachel Beatrice Kay-Shuttleworth MBE (1886–1967) was an English embroiderer, lace-maker, textile collector, teacher and philanthropist. Her textile collection is held at Gawthorpe Hall in Burnley, Lancashire, her family home.

== Early life ==
Kay-Shuttleworth was born on 17 February 1886 and was the daughter of Ughtred Kay-Shuttleworth, 1st Baron Shuttleworth (1844–1939) and Blanche Marion Parish (died 1924). She learned to sew, draw and paint in her childhood, and often visited the Victoria and Albert Museum when staying at her family's South Kensington home. She was influenced by the Arts and Crafts Movement and believed in the importance of creativity and craft for social and economic development; she taught textile skills in the community.

== Textiles ==
Kay-Shuttleworth was an embroiderer and lace-maker, and started to collect textiles around 1912 to help with her teaching. The collection grew through donations from her family and friends, and during her lifetime grew to some 11,000 items, now increased to around 30,000. She gave the items hand-written labels, often written in green ink. Her collection is now maintained by a charity, The Rachel Kay-Shuttleworth Collections, operating under the name Gawthorpe Textiles Collection. It is held and in part displayed at Gawthorpe Hall, which is managed by Lancashire County Council and owned by the National Trust. Kay-Shuttleworth opened Gawthorpe to the community as a "Craft House" and worked to secure funding for its future. Schools, colleges and craft groups were welcomed to visit the house and collections during her lifetime, and talks and study tours are now arranged by the charity, along with work with schools which won the Sandford Award in 2014.

== Girlguiding ==
Kay-Shuttleworth played a major part in the early days of Girlguiding in Lancashire. She was the first County Commissioner, appointed in 1916, and held that position for over 30 years. A sampler presented to her on her retirement included at least one stitch made by every Guide in the county. She was awarded the Silver Fish, Guiding's highest award, for her services. A gate in the grounds of Gawthorpe Hall commemorates her association with Guiding.

== Public service ==
Kay-Shuttleworth was appointed as a Justice of the peace in 1934 and was on the county youth committee and the county records committee. She was involved with the British Red Cross, Women's Voluntary Service, and the Civic Arts Association, and was appointed MBE in the 1949 New Year Honours "For public services in Lancashire".

== Death ==
Rachel Kay-Shuttleworth did not marry, and died at Gawthorpe on 20 April 1967, aged 81.

== Legacy ==
Kay-Shuttleworth's collection, known as the Gawthorpe Textiles Collection, is internationally recognised as a significant collection. The collection influences other designers: as examples, a flooring company has produced a "Gawthorpe" range of designs, inspired by items from the collection and named after members of Kay-Shuttleworth's family, and a knitting designer has created a design for a tam based on a coverlet in the collection, which was embroidered by Kay-Shuttleworth in honour of a 17th-century ancestor.

The Burnley, Pendle and Rossendale Council for Voluntary Services (BPRCVS) headquarters building in Burnley is named the Rachel Kay-Shuttleworth building.
