= James Kay-Shuttleworth =

English politician and educationist (1804–1887)

Sir James Kay-Shuttleworth Bt
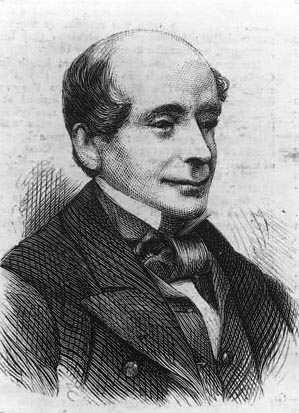
- Sir James Kay-Shuttleworth, Bt
- Born: James Kay; 20 July 1804; Rochdale, Lancashire, England
- Died: 26 May 1877 (aged 72); Kensington, London, England
- Education: University of Edinburgh
- Father: Robert Kay
- Relatives: Joseph Kay (brother); Edward Ebenezer Kay (brother)

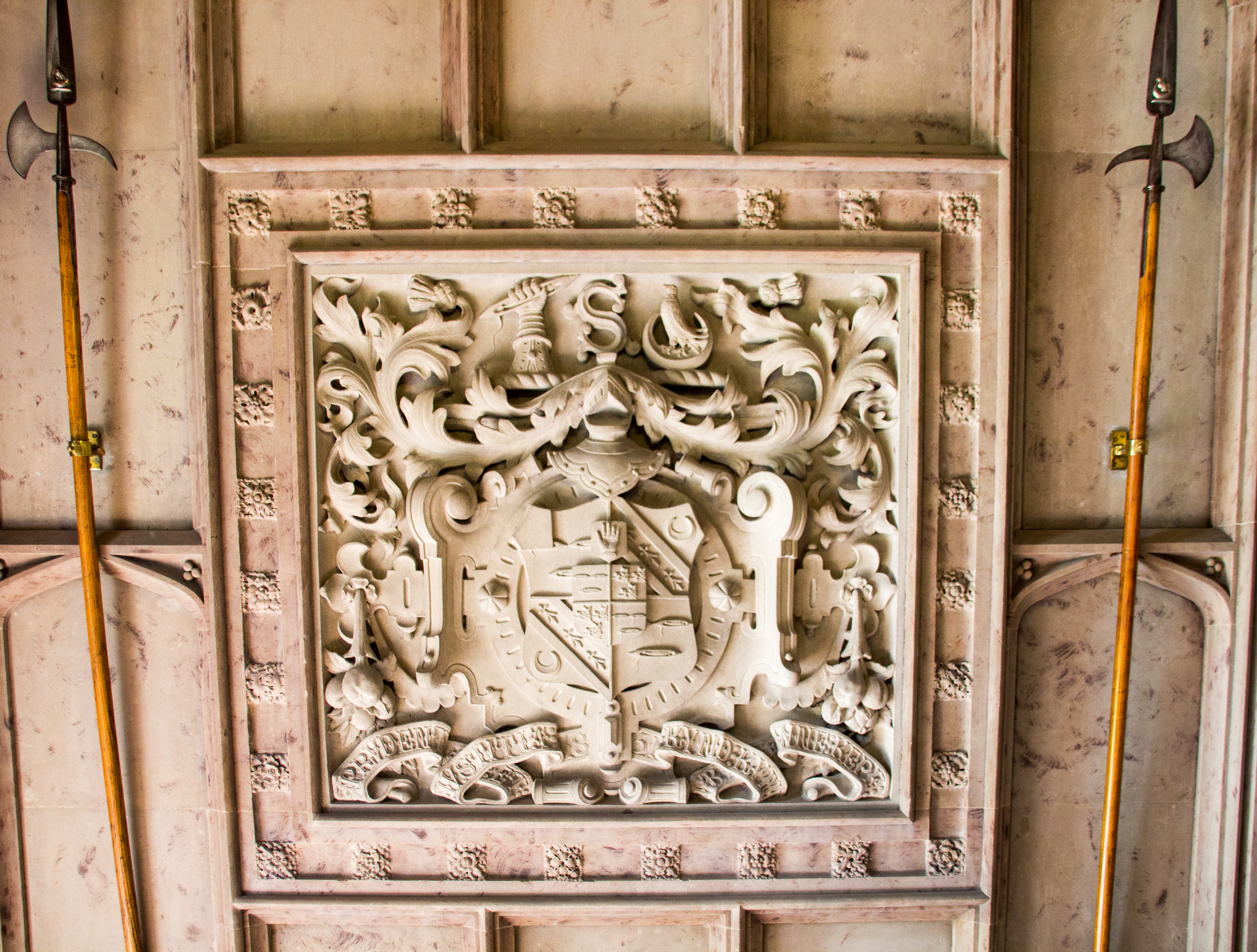
1851 plasterwork at Gawthorpe Hall, showing arms of Sir James Phillips Kay-Shuttleworth, 1st Baronet, with inescutcheon of pretence for his wife

Sir James Phillips Kay-Shuttleworth, 1st Baronet (20 July 1804 – 26 May 1877, born James Kay) of Gawthorpe Hall, Lancashire, was a British politician and educationist. He founded a further-education college that would eventually become Plymouth Marjon University.

== Early life ==
He was born James Kay at Rochdale, Lancashire, the son of Robert Kay and the brother of Joseph Kay and Sir Edward Ebenezer Kay.

== Career ==
At first engaged in a Rochdale bank, he became in 1824 a medical student at the University of Edinburgh. He settled in Manchester about 1827 and was elected to membership of the Manchester Literary and Philosophical Society on 23 January 1829. He was instrumental in setting up the Manchester Statistical Society. He worked for the Ardwick and Ancoats Dispensary. While still known simply as Dr James Kay, he wrote The Moral and Physical Condition of the Working Class Employed in the Cotton Manufacture in Manchester (1832), which Friedrich Engels cited in The Condition of the Working Class in England. The experience he gained of the conditions of the poor in Lancashire factory districts, along with his interest in economic science, led to an appointment in 1835 as poor law commissioner in Norfolk and Suffolk and later in the London districts. In 1839, he became the first secretary of a committee formed by the Privy Council to administer the Government grant for public education in Britain.

In 1840, he founded with E. Carleton Tufnell the Battersea Normal College for the training of teachers of pauper children. This became St John's College, Battersea, which later merged to form the College of St Mark and St John and moved to Plymouth. In 2012, it gained full university status as the University of St Mark & St John. The original college was the first secular training college for schoolteachers; today's system of national school education, with public inspection, trained teachers and the support of state as well as local funds, is largely due to its founders' initiative.

== Later life ==
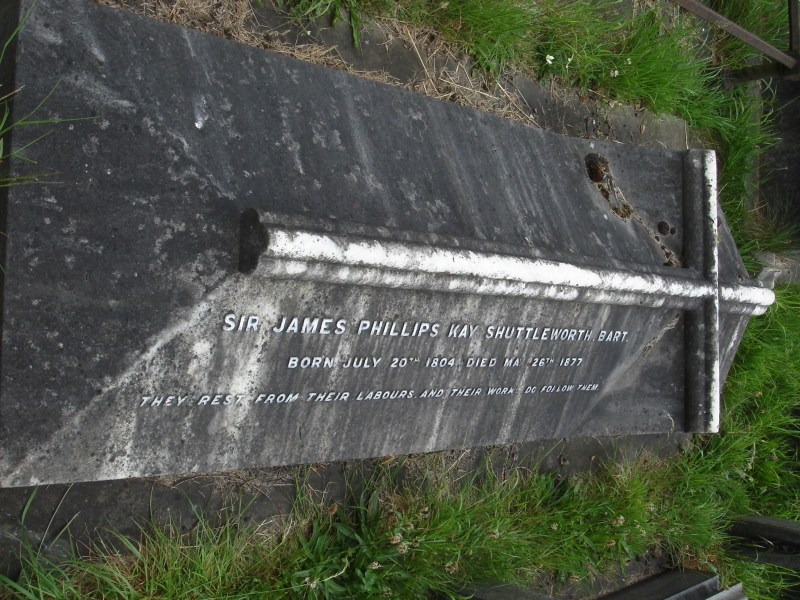
Funerary monument, Brompton Cemetery, London

A breakdown in health led him to resign his post on the committee in 1849, but recovery allowed him an active part in the central relief committee instituted under Lord Derby during the Lancashire cotton famine of 1861–1865. He was created a baronet of Gawthorpe Hall in the County Palatine of Lancaster in 1849. Until the end of his life, he interested himself in the movements of the Liberal Party in Lancashire and in the progress of education. His Physiology, Pathology and Treatment of Asphyxia became a standard textbook. He also wrote numerous papers on public education. He was a key figure in the foundation of the Girls' Public Day School Company and a member of its council until shortly before his death.

== Personal life ==
In 1842, he married Janet Shuttleworth (born 9 November 1817, half-sister of Marianne North), assuming by royal licence his bride's name and arms. His wife had inherited the estate centred on Gawthorpe Hall in Padiham at the age of four months.

They had five children. His eldest son, Sir Ughtred James Kay-Shuttleworth (1844–1939), became a well-known Liberal politician, as MP for Hastings from 1869 to 1880 and for the Clitheroe division of Lancashire from 1885 to 1902, when he was created Baron Shuttleworth. He was Chancellor of the Duchy of Lancaster in 1886, and secretary to the Admiralty between 1892 and 1895.

Charlotte Brontë visited the Kay-Shuttleworths at Gawthorpe Hall in 1850 and in 1855. Janet Kay-Shuttleworth introduced her, by letter, to her future biographer Elizabeth Gaskell in 1849, then brought them together at the Kay-Shuttleworths' rented home in the Lake District in August 1850, beginning the fruitful friendship between Brontë and Gaskell.

James Kay-Shuttleworth died in 1877 in London and is buried in Brompton Cemetery, London.

== Additional sources ==
- Engels, Friedrich; McLellan, David (1999). The Condition of the Working Class in England. New York: Oxford University Press. ISBN 0-19-283688-9.
- Selleck, R. J. W. (1994). James Kay-Shuttleworth : journey of an outsider. Newbury Park, Ilford, Essex: Woburn Press. ISBN 0-7130-0198-4. OCLC 28022141.

== External resources ==
- James Kay-Shuttleworth Papers at the John Rylands Library, Manchester.

Government offices
| New office | Permanent Secretary of the Committee of Council on Education; 1839–1849 | Succeeded by Sir Ralph Lingen |
Baronetage of the United Kingdom
| New creation | Baronet (of Gawthorpe Hall); 1849–1877 | Succeeded by Ughtred Kay-Shuttleworth |
