= Boudica's Way =

Long-distance footpath in Norfolk, England

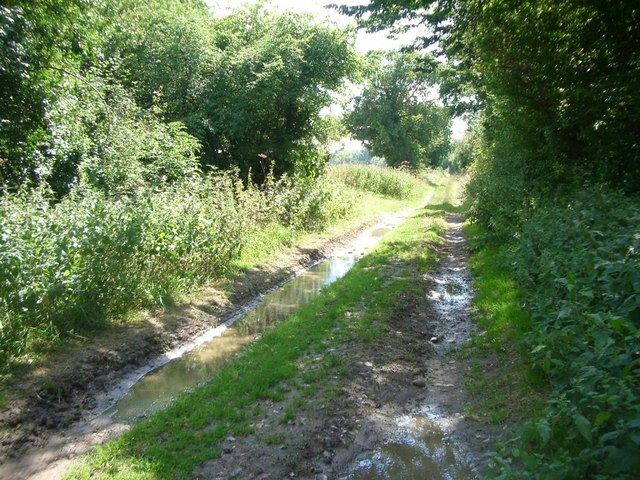
- Boudica's Way Trail
- Length: 36 mi (58 km)
- Location: East Anglia
- Designation: Diss railway station and Norwich railway station
- Use: Hiking
- Highest point: 223 ft (68 m)

Boudica's Way is a waymarked long-distance footpath in East Anglia, England, United Kingdom. It is 36-mile (58 km) in length and runs from Norwich to Diss, near the border with Suffolk, and follows close to Roman roads and passes through Caistor St. Edmund, a settlement tracing its roots to the Roman period. Along its route, it also passes through the picturesque villages of Saxlingham Nethergate, Shotesham, and Pulham Market.

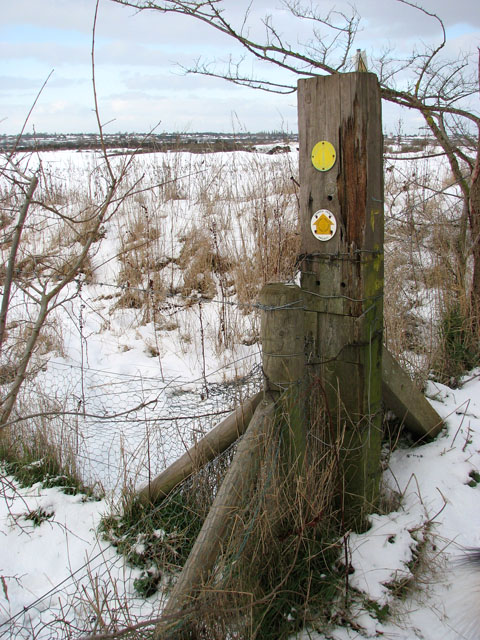
Footpath marker beside Boudica's Way

== History ==
The route commemorates the warrior queen of the Iceni, Boudica, who rebelled against the early Roman government and military control in the region of what is now South Norfolk. The path is parallel to the old Roman Pye Road, now the A140 road.
