= Pulham Market =

Village in Norfolk, England

Coordinates: 52.43°N 1.23°E

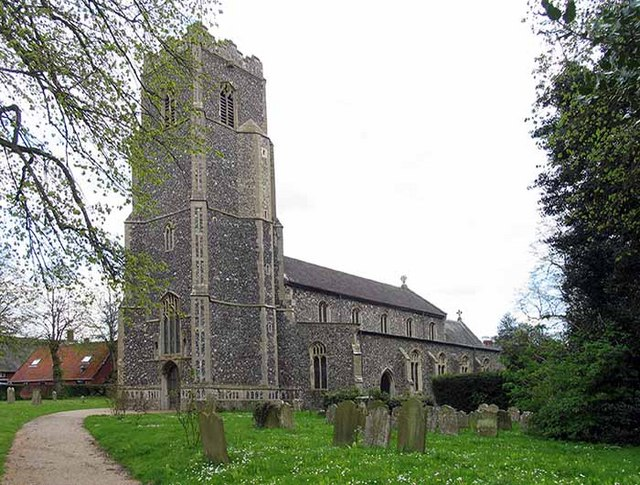
- St Mary Magdalene Church, Pulham Market

- Location within Norfolk
- Area: 12.08 km^{2} (4.66 sq mi)
- Population: 977 (2011)
  - Density: 81/km^{2} (210/sq mi)
- OS grid reference: TM196862
- Civil parish: Pulham Market
- District: South Norfolk
- Shire county: Norfolk
- Region: East
- Country: England
- Sovereign state: United Kingdom
- Post town: DISS
- Postcode district: IP21
- Dialling code: 01379
- Police: Norfolk
- Fire: Norfolk
- Ambulance: East of England
- UK Parliament: South Norfolk

Pulham Market is a village and civil parish in the South Norfolk district, in Norfolk, England, about 8 miles (13 km) northeast of Diss and 14 miles (23 km) south of Norwich. The parish covers an area of 12.08 km^{2} (4.66 sq mi) and had a population of 977 at the 2011 census, a slight decrease from 999 in 443 households at the 2001 census. It includes the hamlet of Bush Green.

== History ==
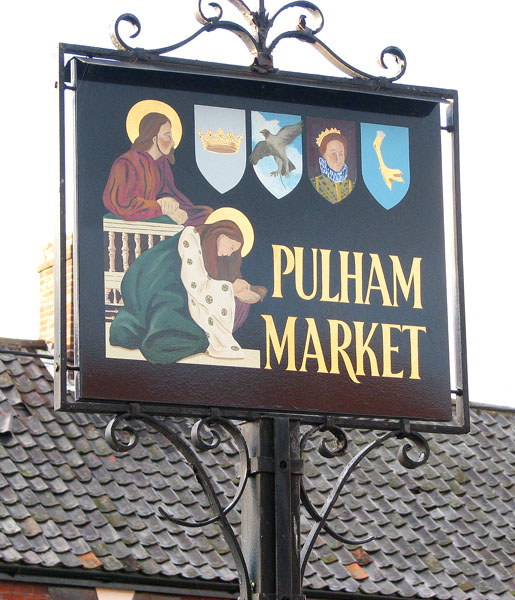
Village sign

The earliest recorded spelling is Polleham. Pulham is referenced in the Domesday Book of 1086 as a single manor (including both Pulham Market and Pulham St Mary) and being part of the Earsham hundred. The name Pulham is thought to mean the "farmhouse, homestead or enclosure by the pool, water meadow or stream". There is a "beck" (Norfolk dialect for a small watercourse) that flows by both villages.

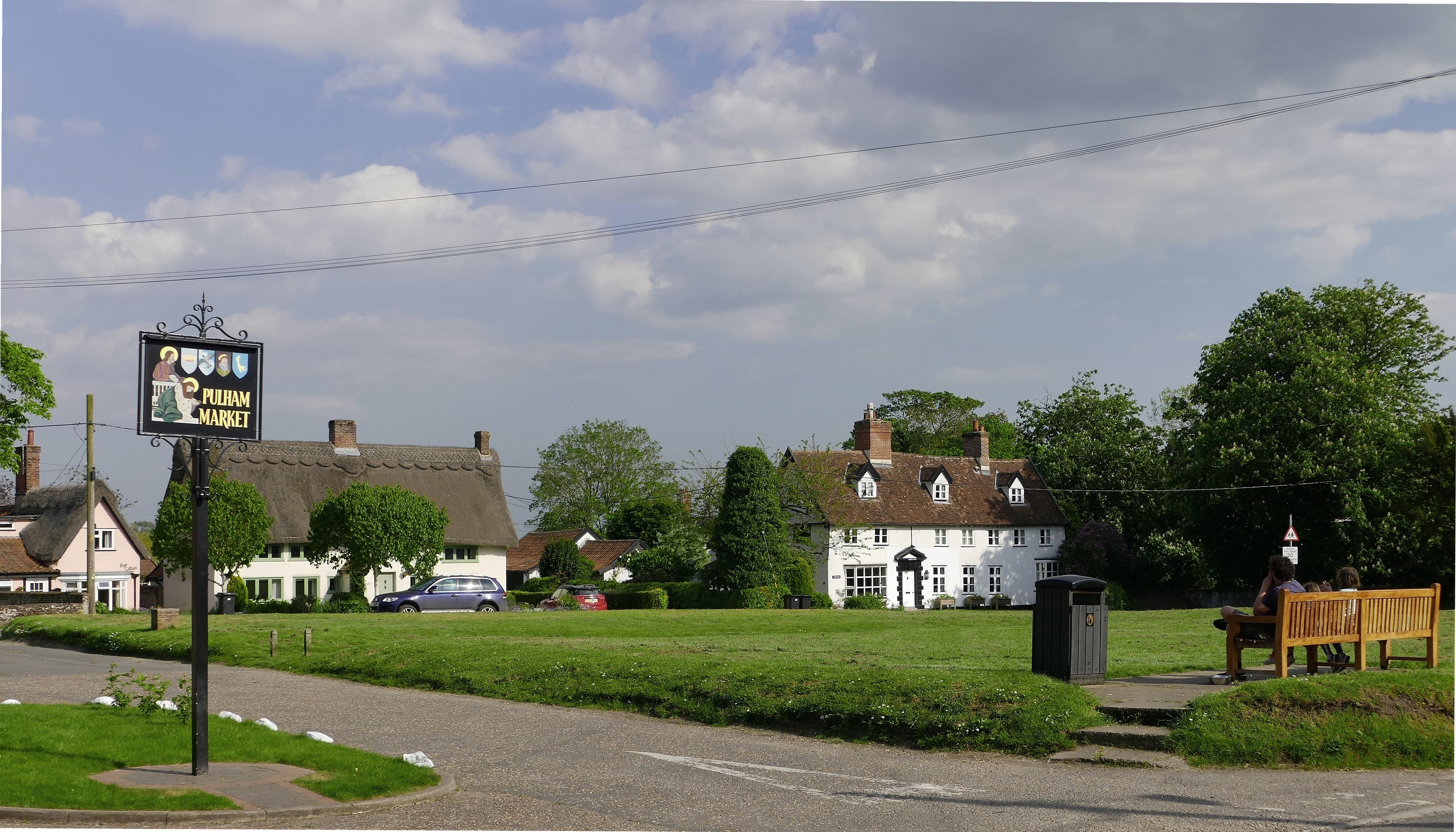
Village green and sign

Older maps and documents name the parish or village "Pulham Saint Mary Magdalene" after the dedication of its parish church. The neighbouring parish and village was historically known as "Pulham Saint Mary the Virgin" after the dedication of its own parish church, though it is these days typically abbreviated to Pulham St Mary. In modern times the two villages of Pulham St Mary and Pulham Market are often together described as "The Pulhams", including on road signs in the surrounding areas.

The village was struck by an F0/T1 tornado on 23 November 1981, part of the record-breaking nationwide tornado outbreak on that day. Another tornado later struck nearby Pulham St Mary.

As of 2019, the village has a primary school, a doctors' surgery, two pubs (The Crown and The Falcon), a shop/post office, and several other community facilities.

== Transport ==
The village is served by First Eastern Counties services 36A and 36B, which runs from Horsford to Harleston via Norwich city centre; on weekdays there is a limited 584 service to Diss, run by Simonds CountryLink.

The village was served by Pulham Market railway station on the now closed Waveney Valley Line between 1855 and 1953. The nearest railway station is now Diss.

The long-distance footpath Boudica's Way passes through the village.

== See also ==
- RNAS Pulham
