= Leck, Lancashire =

Leck
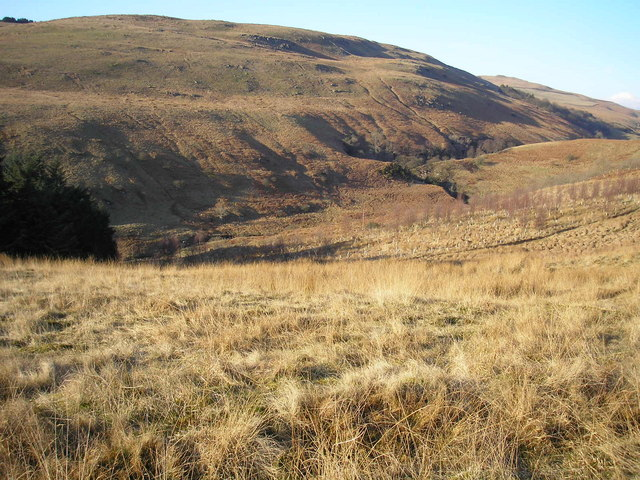
- Leck Beck

- Location in the City of Lancaster district Location within Lancashire
- Population: 260 (2011)
- OS grid reference: SD643768
- Civil parish: Leck
- District: Lancaster
- Shire county: Lancashire
- Region: North West
- Country: England
- Sovereign state: United Kingdom
- Post town: CARNFORTH
- Postcode district: LA6
- Dialling code: 01524
- Police: Lancashire
- Fire: Lancashire
- Ambulance: North West
- UK Parliament: Morecambe and Lunesdale

Leck is a civil parish in the English county of Lancashire. The parish of Leck had a population of 189 recorded in the 2001 census. In the 2011 census Leck was grouped with Ireby (2001 pop. 78) to give a total of 260. It is located next to the Leck Beck close to the main A65, 2 miles (3.2 km) south east of the Cumbrian town of Kirkby Lonsdale. Administratively it forms part of the City of Lancaster, Lancaster itself being 18 miles (29 km) away.

The Church of St Peter was built in 1878-79 and burnt down in 1913, but was accurately re-built in 1915.

Since 2016 Leck has been within the Yorkshire Dales National Park.

== Geology ==
Leck is located on two ancient geological fault lines: the Dent Fault and the Craven Fault. These meet at around 54.190507°N 2.527339°W. In the Carboniferous to Jurassic periods these major earth movements formed the dramatic landscape of Lonsdale and the Aire Gap in Craven District

== See also ==
- Listed buildings in Leck, Lancashire
