= Joseph Kay (economist) =

Joseph Kay QC (27 February 1821 – 9 October 1878) was an English economist and judge on the Northern Circuit.

Kay was born at Salford, Lancashire, the brother of Sir James Kay-Shuttleworth, 1st Baronet and Sir Edward Kay. Educated privately and at Trinity College, Cambridge, he was called to the bar at the Inner Temple in 1848. He was appointed judge of the Salford Hundred court of record in 1862 and became a member of the Portico Library in Manchester. In 1869 was made a Queen's Counsel.

Kay is best known for a series of works on the social condition of the poor in France, Switzerland, the Netherlands, Germany, and Austria, the materials for which he gathered on a four years tour as travelling bachelor of his university. They were The Education of the Poor in England and Europe (London, 1846); The Social Condition of the People in England and Europe (London, 1850, 2 vols.); The Condition and Education of Poor Children in English and in German Towns (Manchester, 1853). He was also the author of The Law relating to Shipmasters and Seamen (London, 1875) and Free Trade in Land (1879, with a memoir).

In 1863 Joseph married Mary Drummond, daughter of Maria Drummond and Thomas Drummond, his marriage lasting fifteen years until his eventual death at Fredley, near Dorking, Surrey in 1878.

Legal offices
Preceded by John Archibald Russell	Solicitor-General of Durham; 1872–1878	Succeeded by Gainsford Bruce
