= Edward Ebenezer Kay =

British jurist (1822–1897)

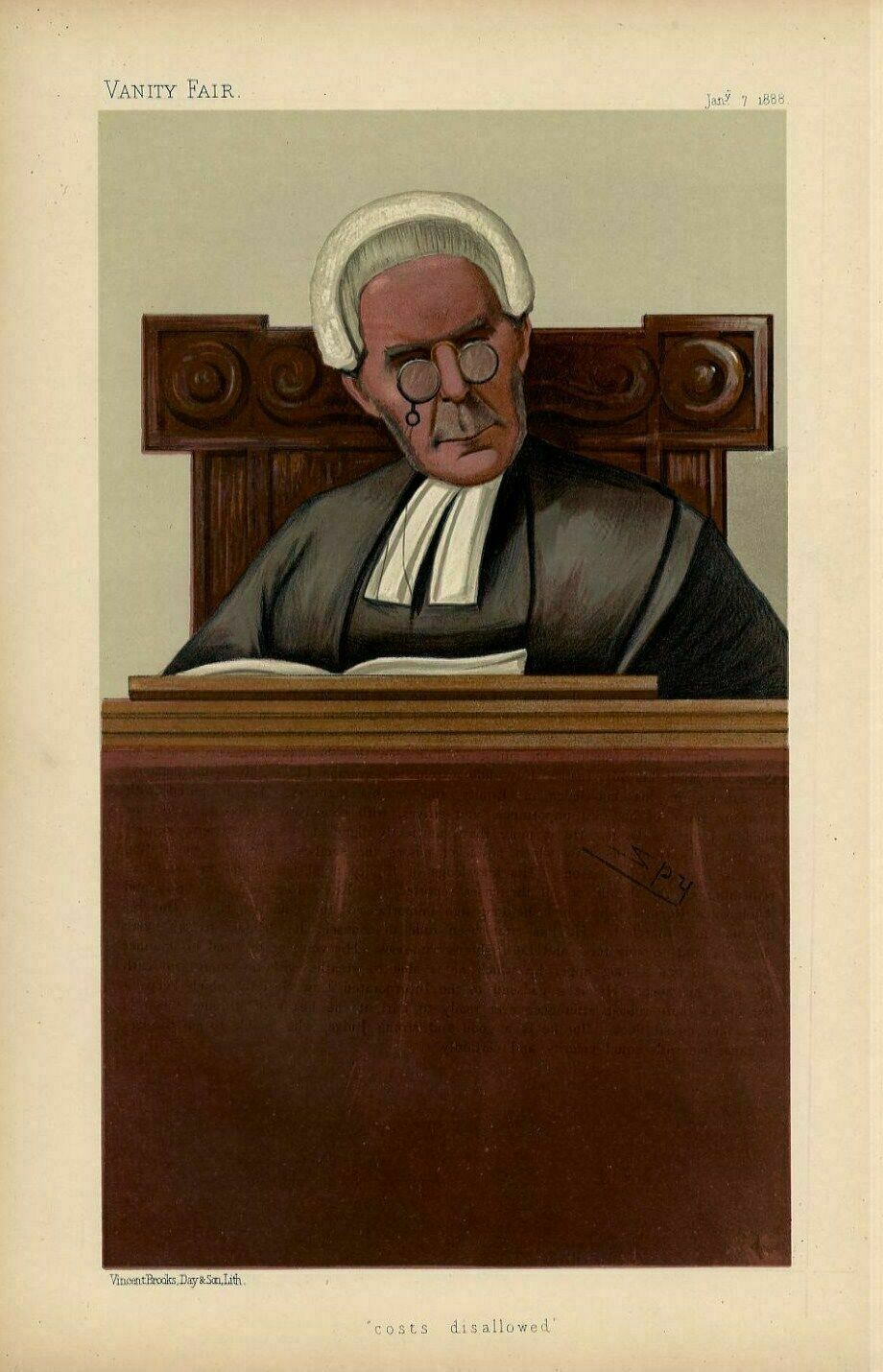
Vanity Fair caricature, 1888

Sir Edward Ebenezer Kay (2 July 1822 – 16 March 1897) was a British jurist. He was an English High Court judge (Chancery Division) from 1881 to 1890, and a Lord Justice of Appeal from 1890, when he was made a Privy Councillor, until his retirement in January 1897.

He was born in Meadowcroft near Rochdale and grew up in Bury (both nowadays part of Greater Manchester) and was the brother of Sir James Kay-Shuttleworth, 1st Baronet and of Joseph Kay. Their father Robert Kay of Rochdale was a follower of the Nonconformist Lancashire Congregational Union and served as its treasurer until 1817.

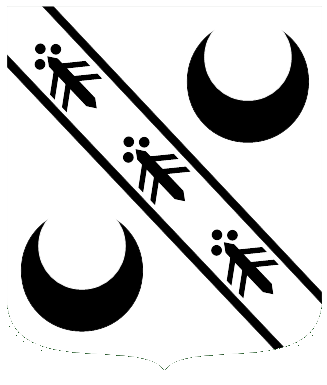
Arms displayed at Lincoln's Inn

He was admitted to Trinity College, Cambridge in 1839 and received a B.A. in 1844 and an M.A. in 1847. He was admitted to Lincoln's Inn in 1844, called to the bar in 1847. He became an authorised reporter at the Court of Chancery and was the author of "Kay's Reports" and part of "Kay and Johnson's Reports" during the period from 1853 to 1858. (Note: The formal titles were Reports of Cases Adjudged in the High Court of Chancery Before Sir William Page Wood, Knt., Vice-Chancellor) He became QC in 1866.

In 1850 he married his wife Mary Valence French, the daughter of William French who was Master of Jesus College from 1820 to 1849.

In 1883 he was living at Thorpe Abbotts in Brockdish, South Norfolk.

His wife died in 1889 or 1890 and he founded the Lady Kay Scholarship in her memory, open to students at Jesus College, Cambridge who have the intention of seeking Holy Orders in the Church of England.
