= Gawthorpe Hall =

Grade I listed Elizabethan country house

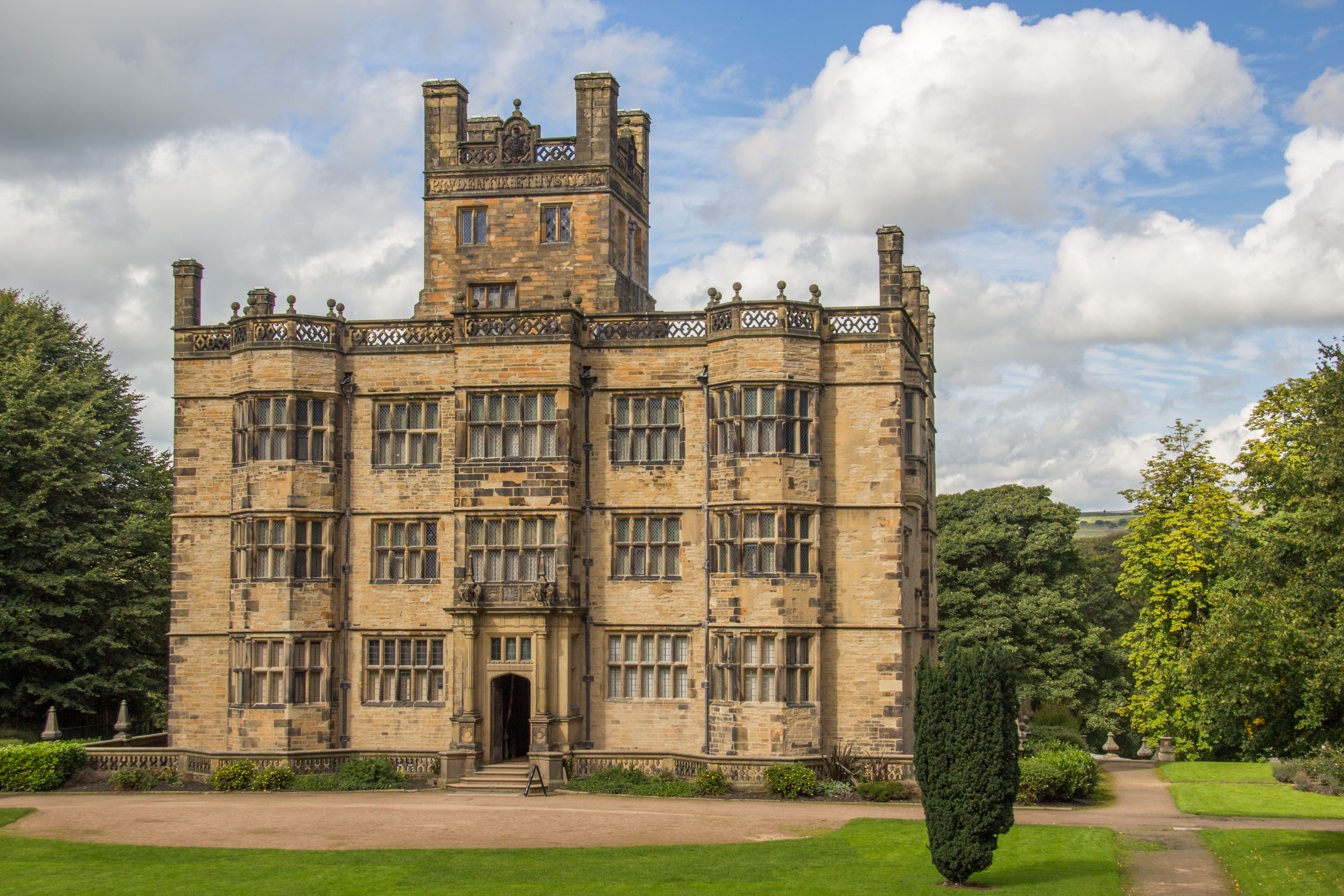
- Gawthorpe Hall from the front

- Location within the Borough of Burnley
- 53.8027°N 2.2948°W
- Location: Ightenhill, Burnley, Lancashire, BB12 8UA

Listed Building – Grade I
- Official name: Gawthorpe Hall and surrounding balustrade
- Designated: 1 April 1953
- Reference no.: 1237626

Gawthorpe Hall is an Elizabethan country house on the banks of the River Calder, in Ightenhill, a civil parish in the Borough of Burnley, Lancashire, England. Its estate extends into Padiham, with the Stockbridge Drive entrance situated there. The house is traditionally attributed to Robert Smythson. In the mid-19th century, the hall was altered by Charles Barry, the architect of the Houses of Parliament. Since 1953 it has been designated a Grade I listed building. In 1970 the 4th Lord Shuttleworth gave the hall to the National Trust, with a 99-year lease to Lancashire County Council. Both bodies jointly administer the hall and in 2015 the council provided £500,000 funding for restoration work on the south and west sides of the house.

== History ==
Gawthorpe Hall's origins are somewhat disputed (see Champness (2008).) Pevsner suggests the origins lie in a pele tower, a strong fortification built by the Shuttleworths in the 14th century as a defence against invading Scots. The Shuttleworths occupied Shuttleworth Hall near Hapton from the 12th century. The diet of the family in Elizabethan times is known from their household books. The Shuttleworths bought glasses for rose water in 1589 and a "stillatory" for distillation in 1590. Most of their food was bought locally or came from their own farms, but spices were bought from London.

The Elizabethan house at Gawthorpe was dovetailed around the pele tower from plans drawn up by Richard Shuttleworth but carried out after his death by his brother the Reverend Lawrence Shuttleworth. The foundation stone was laid on 26 August 1600.

In 1604 Richard Stone of Carr House in Bretherton, imported Irish panel boards and timber and stored 1,000 pieces in the tithe barn at Hoole until they were needed. Mottoes are found in the front porch and around the top of the tower. The initials KS, Kay-Shuttleworth occur in decoration throughout the house, on the front door and plaster roundels on the ceiling in the main dining room. Miss Rachel, as the Honourable Rachel Kay-Shuttleworth was known locally, lived at the hall from 1953 until her death in 1967. In 1970, her nephew gave the hall to the National Trust, to be managed in association with Lancashire County Council, on a 99-year lease to the latter. In 2015 the council provided funding of £500,000 to enable urgent repairs.

== Architecture and description ==
The original house, which Pevsner suggests began as a pele tower, was developed into an Elizabethan mansion in the very early 1600s. Clare Hartwell, in her 2009 revised Lancashire: North edition of the Pevsner Buildings of England, notes the traditional attribution to Robert Smythson and suggests that, if not by him, "the design must have been influenced by his work". (Note: Clare Hartwell notes the parallels with Smythson's Barlborough Hall, Derbyshire, and describes Gawthorpe's frontage as "strikingly similar" to Wootton Lodge.) By the middle of the 19th century, the house was "near ruin" and Sir James Phillips Kay-Shuttleworth, 1st Baronet engaged Charles Barry to undertake an extensive rebuilding.

=== Listing designations ===
Gawthorpe Hall is a Grade I listed building. Other listed buildings associated with the hall include the Great Barn (built 1602–04), also listed at Grade I, and the old farmhouse (1605–06, now used as the estate offices), the game larder, the coach house (1870), a terrace wall, and the lodges and gateways on Habergham and Stockbridge drives (both c.1849), all listed at Grade II.

== Garden and grounds ==
The small ornamental garden, created in the early 1850s, was laid out on a terrace overlooking the River Calder at the rear of the house by Barry. The course of the river was diverted away from Gawthorpe Hall in the 19th century because of pollution and again diverted to accommodate an open cast coal scheme north of the river in Padiham in the 1960s. Following the Second World War, during which Richard Kay-Shuttleworth, 2nd Baron Shuttleworth, was killed as a fighter pilot in the Battle of Britain, the family had the formal garden dug up, as maintenance costs had become prohibitively expensive. The layout of the garden is still visible, especially during dry summer months.

Gawthorpe is a trailhead on the Brontë Way, a 43-mile (69 km) long-distance footpath that crosses the South Pennines to Haworth before continuing to Oakwell Hall, Birstall, West Yorkshire.

=== Burnley F.C. training ground ===
In 1955, the Burnley F.C. chairman Bob Lord purchased 80 acres (32 ha) of Gawthorpe land, making Burnley one of the first clubs to set up a purpose-built training centre. By the 21st century, Burnley's three-decade absence from top flight football had left the facilities dated, with the old groundsman’s bungalow used for media meetings and the pitches prone to flooding. In spring 2017, the club opened a new £10.6-million training complex as the base for the senior squad and the club's academy.

== Notable occupants ==
- Colonel Richard Shuttleworth (1587–1669), Member of Parliament for Preston and High Sheriff of Lancashire
- Richard Shuttleworth (1683–1749), Member of Parliament for Lancashire
- James Shuttleworth (politician) (1714–1773), Member of Parliament for Lancashire and High Sheriff of Yorkshire
- Sir James Phillips Kay-Shuttleworth, 1st Baronet (20 July 1804 – 26 May 1877)
- Ughtred James Kay-Shuttleworth, 1st Baron Shuttleworth, PC, DL (18 December 1844 – 20 December 1939)
- Richard Kay-Shuttleworth, 2nd Baron Shuttleworth (1937–1940), a fighter pilot killed in the Battle of Britain
- Rachel Beatrice Kay-Shuttleworth MBE (17 February 1886 - 20 April 1967): Rachel was the third daughter of Ughtred Kay-Shuttleworth, 1st Baron Shuttleworth and his wife Blanche, Lady Shuttleworth. She was an educator, an embroiderer, a maker of lace, a philanthropist, and a social activist. In 1912, she started collecting textiles and crafts as teaching aids. Her collection was later included in the Gawthorpe Textiles Collection that is kept at Gawthorpe Hall, and administered by a separate charity trust.

== Gallery ==
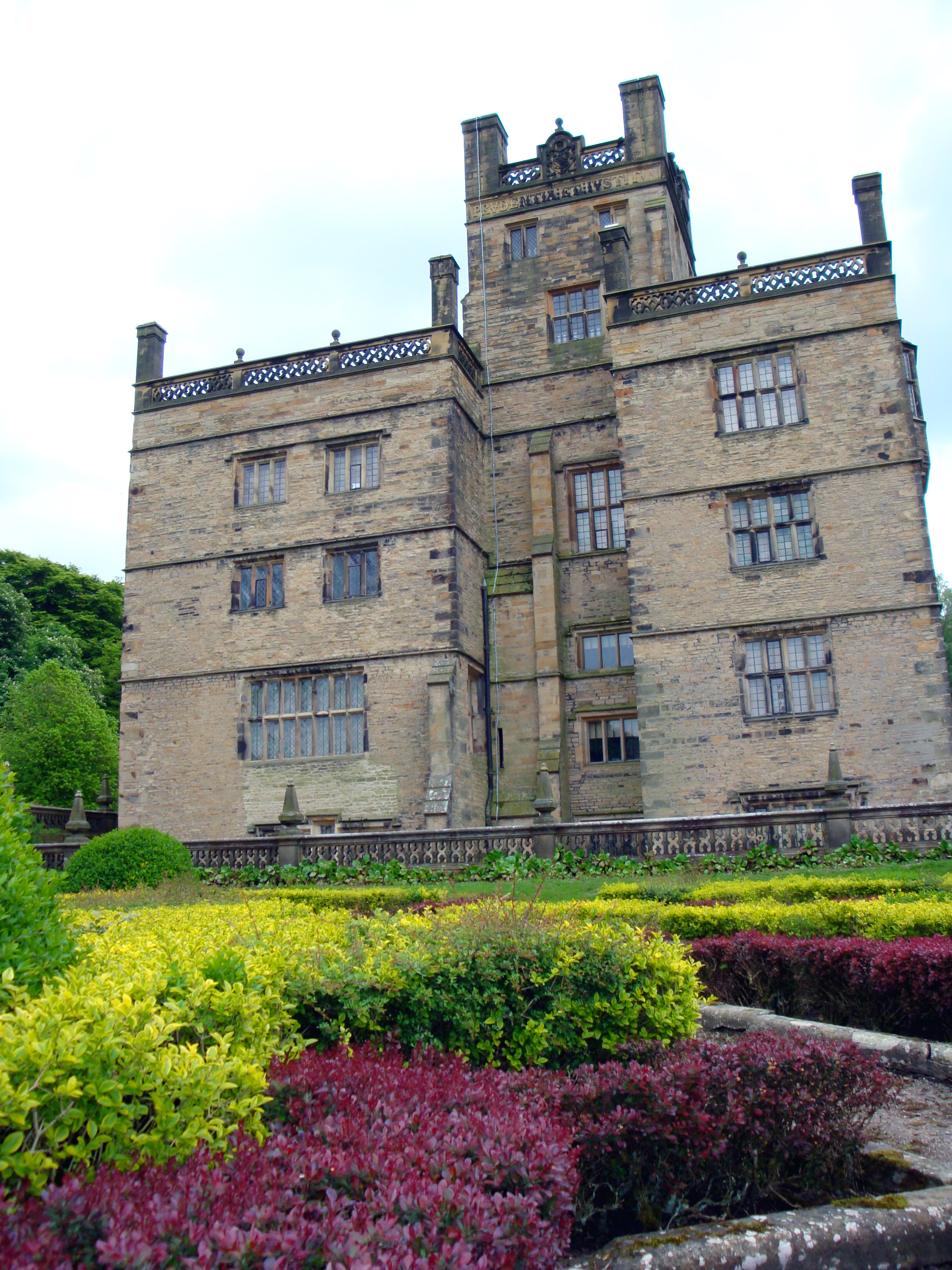
The rear of Gawthorpe Hall, with a portion of the rear gardens

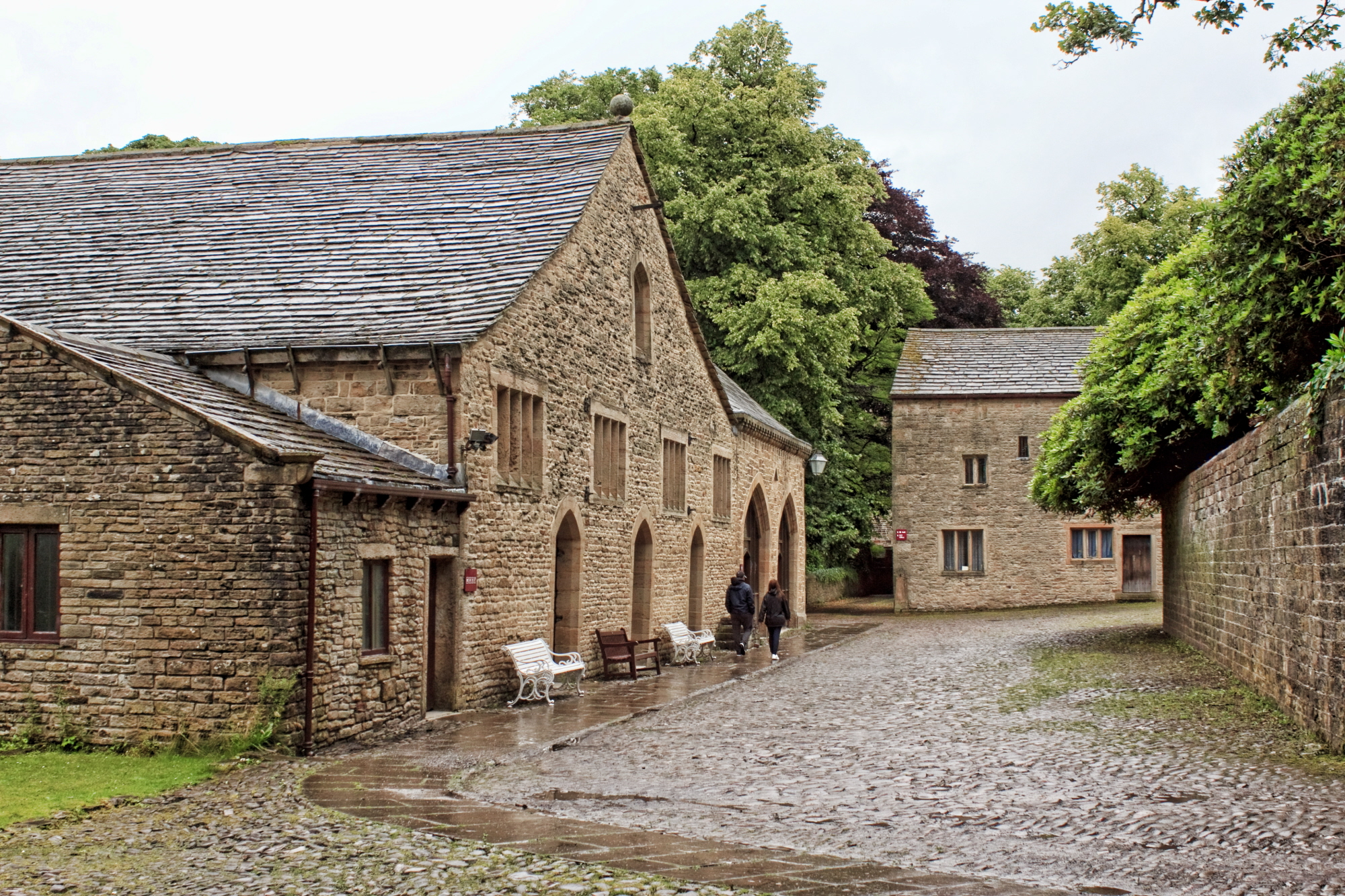
The Great Barn, coach house and old farmhouse to the southwest of the hall

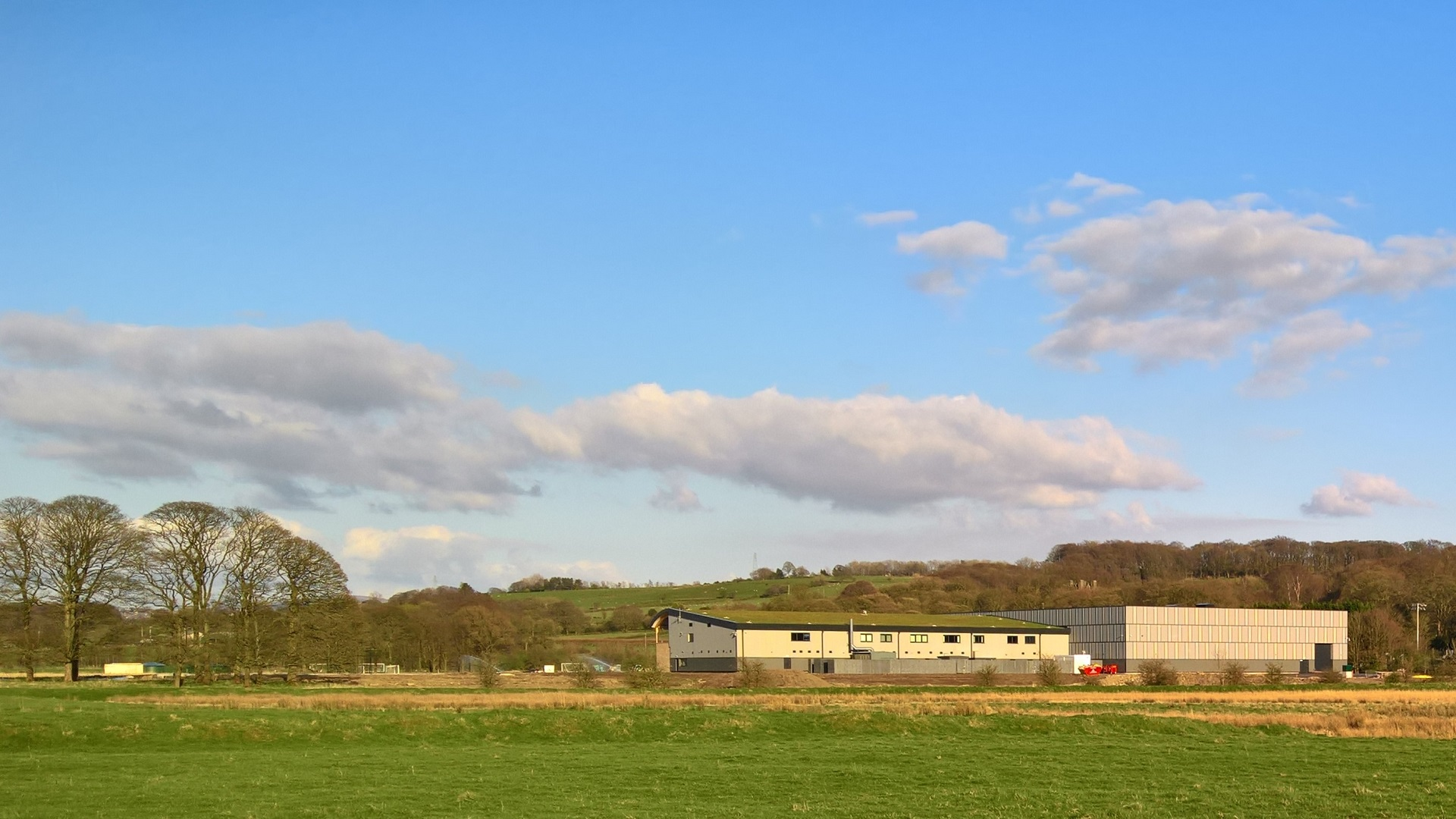
Burnley F.C.'s training facility, on the north side of the river, completed in 2017

== Sources ==
- Armstrong, Duncan (1985). Owd Padiham - a pictorial history. Padiham: Mercer Print.
- Dean (2013). Gawthorpe Hall, Lancashire. Swindon, UK: National Trust. ISBN 978-1-843-59405-5.
- Hartwell, Clare; Pevsner, Nikolaus (2009). Lancashire: North. The Buildings of England. New Haven, US and London: Yale University Press. ISBN 978-0-300-12667-9.
- Inglis, Simon (1996). Football Grounds of Britain. Collins Willow. ISBN 978-0-002-18426-7.
- Jenkins, Simon (2003). England's Thousand Best Houses. London, UK: Penguin Books. ISBN 978-0-7139-9596-1.
- Lofthouse, Jessica (1978). Lancashire Villages. London: Robert Hale.
- Thirsk, Joan (2007). Food in Early Modern England. London.
- Williams, G. A. (1969). Rachel Kay-Shuttleworth, 1886-1967: A Short Account of Her Life and Work.
