= List of MPs elected to the English parliament in 1626 =

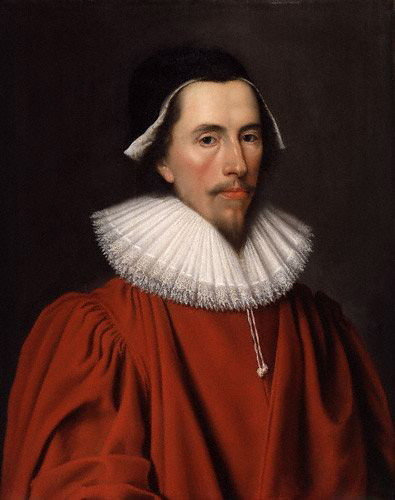
Sir Heneage Finch - speaker

This is a list of members of Parliament (MPs) elected to the second parliament in the reign of King Charles I in 1626.

The second parliament began on 6 February 1626 and was held to 15 June 1626 when it was dissolved.

== List of constituencies and members ==
=== Bedfordshire ===
Constituency	Members	Notes
Bedfordshire	Oliver St John; Sir Oliver Luke	
Bedford	Sir Beauchamp St John; Richard Taylor	
=== Berkshire ===
Constituency	Members	Notes
Berkshire	John Fettiplace; Edmund Dunch	
Windsor	William Russell; Humphrey Newbury	
Reading	Sir Francis Knollys; John Saunders	
Wallingford	Sir Anthony Forrest; Unton Croke	
Abingdon	Sir Robert Knollys	
=== Buckinghamshire ===
Constituency	Members	Notes
Buckinghamshire	Sir Francis Goodwin; Sir Thomas Denton	
Buckingham	Sir Alexander Denton; Sir John Smythe	
Wycombe	Henry Coke; Edmund Waller	
Aylesbury	Clement Coke; Arthur Goodwin	
Amersham	William Clarke; Francis Drake	
Wendover	John Hampden; Sir Sampson Darrell	
Marlow	John Backhouse; Sir William Hicks, 1st Baronet	
=== Cambridgeshire ===
Constituency	Members	Notes
Cambridgeshire	Sir Edward Peyton, 2nd Baronet; Sir John Cutts	
Cambridge University	Thomas Eden; Sir John Coke	
Cambridge	Thomas Purchase; Thomas Meautys	
=== Cheshire ===
Constituency	Members	Notes
Cheshire	Sir Richard Grosvenor, 1st Baronet; Peter Daniell	
City of Chester	William Gamull; Edward Whitby	
=== Cornwall ===
Constituency	Members	Notes
Cornwall	William Coryton; Sir Francis Godolphin	
Launceston	Bevil Grenville; Richard Scott	
Liskeard	Sir Francis Steward; Joseph Jane	
Lostwithiel	Sir Robert Mansell; Reginald Mohun	
Truro	Francis Rous; Henry Rolle	
Bodmin	Henry Jermyn; Sir Richard Weston	
Helston	Francis Godolphin; Francis Carew	
Saltash	Sir John Hayward; Sir Richard Buller	
Camelford	Edward Lyndley; Sir Thomas Monk	
Grampound	Edward Thomas; Sir Thomas St Aubyn	
Eastlow	Sir James Bagge; Sir John Trevor	
Westlow	Sir John Wolstenholme, 1st Baronet; John Rudhall	
Penryn	Edward Roberts; Sir Edwin Sandys	
Tregoney	Thomas Carey; Sir Robert Killigrew	
Bossiney	Lord Lambart; Paul Specot	
St Ives	Edward Savage; Benjamin Tichborne	Tichborne sat for Petersfield - replaced by William Noy
Fowey	Arthur Bassett; William Murray	
St Germans	Sir John Eliot; Sir Henry Marten	
Mitchell	Francis Crossing; Sir John Smith	
Newport	Sir Henry Hungate; Thomas Williams (junior)	
St Mawes	William Carr; Lord Carey	
Callington	Clipsby Crew; John Rolle	
=== Cumberland ===
Constituency	Members	Notes
Cumberland	Sir George Dalston; Sir Patricius Curwen Bart	
Carlisle	Sir Henry Vane; Richard Graham	
=== Derbyshire ===
Constituency	Members	Notes
Derbyshire	William Lord Cavendish; John Manners	
Derby	Sir Henry Crofts; John Thoroughgood	
=== Devon ===
Constituency	Members	Notes
Devon	John Drake; John Pole	
Exeter	Ignatius Jordan; John Hayne	
Totnes	Arthur Champernoun; Philip Holditch	
Plymouth	John Granville; Thomas Sherville (merchant)	
Barnstaple	Sir Alexander St John; John Delbridge	
Plympton Erle	Sir Thomas Hele, 1st Baronet; William Strode	
Tavistock	John Pym; John Ratcliffe	
Clifton Dartmouth Hardness	John Upton; Roger Matthew (Merchant)	
Bere Alston	Thomas Wise; William Strode	
Tiverton	John Drake; Peter Ball	Drake chose to sit for Devon - replaced by Richard Oliver
=== Dorset ===
Constituency	Members	Notes
Dorset	Sir George Morton; Sir Thomas Freke	
Poole	Christopher Erle; John Pyne	
Dorchester	Richard Bushrode; Michael Humphreys	Humphreys died - replaced by William Whiteway
Lyme Regis	Walter Erle; Thomas Paramour	
Weymouth and Melcombe Regis	Sir John Strangways; Arthur Pyne; Giles Green; Bernard Michell	
Bridport	Lewis Dyve; Sir Richard Strode	
Shaftesbury	Samuel Turner; William Whitmore	
Wareham	Nathaniel Napier; Edward Laurence	
Corfe Castle	Sir Robert Napier; Edward Daccombe	
=== Essex ===
Constituency	Members	Notes
Essex	Sir Francis Barrington Bt; Harbottle Grimston (senior).	
Colchester	William Towse; Edward Alford.	
Maldon	Sir William Masham, 1st Baronet; Sir Thomas Cheek	
Harwich	Nathaniel Rich; Christopher Harris	
=== Gloucestershire ===
Constituency	Members	Notes
Gloucestershire	Sir Robert Tracy; Sir Robert Pointz	Browne Willis gives Sir Maurice Berkeley and John Dutton
Gloucester	Christopher Caple; John Browne	
Cirencester	Sir Neville Poole; John George	
Tewkesbury	Sir Dudley Diggs; Sir Baptist Hicks	
=== Hampshire ===
Constituency	Members	Notes
Hampshire	Sir Henry Wallop; Robert Wallop	
Winchester	Richard Tichborne; Henry Whitehead	
Southampton	Sir John Mill, 1st Baronet; George Gallop	
Portsmouth	Sir James Fullerton; Thomas Whiteman	
Petersfield	Benjamin Tichborne; William Uvedale	
Yarmouth	Sir Edward Conway; John Oglander	
Newport	Christopher Yelverton; Philip Fleming	
Stockbridge	Sir Robert Gifford; Sir Thomas Badger	
Newtown	Sir Thomas Barrington, 2nd Baronet; Thomas Malet	
Lymington	Herbert Doddington; John More	
Christchurch	Nathaniel Tomkins; Robert Norton	
Whitchurch	Sir Thomas Jervoise; Sir Robert Oxenbridge	
Andover	Lord Henry Paulet; John Shuter	
=== Herefordshire ===
Constituency	Members	Notes
Herefordshire	Sir Robert Harley; Sir Walter Pye	
Hereford	James Clerke; Richard Weaver	
Leominster	James Tomkins; Edward Littleton	
=== Hertfordshire ===
Constituency	Members	Notes
Hertfordshire	Sir John Boteler; Sir Thomas Dacres	
St Albans	Sir Charles Morrison, 1st Baronet; Sir Edward Goring	
Hertford	Sir William Harrington; Sir Capell Bedell, 1st Baronet	
=== Huntingdonshire ===
Constituency	Members	Notes
Huntingdonshire	Edward Montagu; Sir Robert Payne	
Huntingdon	Sir Arthur Mainwaring; John Goldsborough	
=== Kent ===
Constituency	Members	Notes
Kent	Sir Edward Hales, 1st Baronet; Sir Edward Scott	
Canterbury	Sir John Finch; James Palmer	
Rochester	Henry Clerke (Sir) Thomas Walsingham (elder)	
Maidstone	Sir George Fane; Francis Barnham	
Queenborough	Roger Palmer; Robert Pooley	
=== Lancashire ===
Constituency	Members	Notes
Lancashire	Robert Stanley; Gilbert Hoghton	
Preston	George Gerard; Thomas Fanshawe	
Lancaster	Thomas Jermyn; Sir Thomas Fanshawe	
Newton	Sir Miles Fleetwood; Sir Henry Edmonds	
Wigan	Sir Anthony St John; Sir William Pooley	
Clitheroe	Sir Ralph Assheton; George Kirke	
Liverpool	Edward Bridgeman; Thomas Stanley	
=== Leicestershire ===
Constituency	Members	Notes
Leicestershire	Sir Henry Hastings; Francis Staresmore	
Leicester	Sir Humphrey May; Sir George Hastings	
=== Lincolnshire ===
Constituency	Members	Notes
Lincolnshire	Sir William Airmine; John Monson	
Lincoln	Sir Thomas Grantham; Robert Monson	
Boston	Sir Edward Barkham; Richard Oakley	
Grimsby	Henry Pelham; William Skinner	
Stamford	Montagu Bertie; Brian Palmes	
Grantham	John Wingfield; Edward Stirmin	
=== Middlesex ===
Constituency	Members	Notes
Middlesex	Sir Edward Spencer; Sir Gilbert Gerard, 1st Baronet of Harrow on the Hill	
Westminster	Sir Robert Pye; Peter Heywood	
City of London	Sir Thomas Middleton; Heneage Finch; Sir Robert Bateman; Sir Maurice Abbot	Finch was Speaker
=== Monmouthshire ===
Constituency	Members	Notes
Monmouthshire	William Herbert; Nicholas Arnold	
Monmouth Boroughs	William Fortesue	
=== Norfolk ===
Constituency	Members	Notes
Norfolk	Sir Edward Coke; Sir Robert Bell	
Norwich	Sir John Suckling; Sir Thomas Hyrne	
King's Lynn	Thomas Gurling; John Cooke	
Yarmouth	Sir John Corbet; Thomas Johnson (Alderman)	
Thetford	Sir John Hobart, 2nd Baronet; Framlingham Gawdy	
Castle Rising	Sir Hamon le Strange; Sir Thomas Bancroft	
=== Northamptonshire ===
Constituency	Members	Notes
Northamptonshire	Sir William Spencer; Sir John Pickering	
Peterborough	Mildmay Lord Burleigh; Laurence Whitaker	
Northampton	Richard Spencer; Christopher Sherland	
Brackley	Sir John Hobart; John Crew	
Higham Ferrers	Sir Thomas Dacres	Sat for Hertfordshire and replaced by Sir George Sondes
=== Northumberland ===
Constituency	Members	Notes
Northumberland	Sir John Fenwick; Sir John Delaval	
Newcastle	Sir Peter Riddel; Sir Henry Anderson	
Morpeth	Sir Thomas Reynell; John Bankes	
Berwick upon Tweed	Sir Robert Jackson; Richard Lowther	
=== Nottinghamshire ===
Constituency	Members	Notes
Nottinghamshire	Henry Stanhope; Sir Thomas Hutchinson	
Nottingham	Sir Gervase Clifton; John Byron	
East Retford	John Lord Haughton; Sir Francis Wortley, 1st Baronet	
=== Oxfordshire ===
Constituency	Members	Notes
Oxfordshire	Hon. James Fiennes; Sir Thomas Wenman	
Oxford University	Sir Thomas Edmondes; John Danvers	
Oxford	John Whistler; Thomas Wentworth	
Woodstock	Edward Tavernor; Sir Gerard Fleetwood	
Banbury	Calcot Chambre	
=== Rutland ===
Constituency	Members	Notes
Rutland	William Bulstrode; Sir Francis Bodenham	
=== Salop ===
Constituency	Members	Notes
Shropshire	Sir Rowland Cotton; Sir Richard Leveson	
Shrewsbury	Sir William Owen; Thomas Owen	
Bridgnorth	Sir William Whitmore, 2nd Baronet; George Vernon	
Ludlow	Richard Tomlins; Ralph Goodwin	
Wenlock	Thomas Lawley; Francis Smallman	
Bishops Castle	William Oakley; Edward Waring	
=== Somerset ===
Constituency	Members	Notes
Somerset	Sir Henry Berkeley; Sir John Horner	
Bristol	John Doughty; John Whitson	
Bath	Richard Gay; William Chapman	
Wells	Sir Edward Rodney; Sir Thomas Lake	
Taunton	Sir Robert Gorges; George Browne	
Bridgwater	Sir Arthur Lake; Edward Popham	
Minehead	Sir John Gill; Thomas Horner	
Ilchester	Sir William Beecher; Robert Caesar	
=== Staffordshire ===
Constituency	Members	Notes
Staffordshire	Sir Simon Weston; Sir William Bowyer	
Lichfield	Sir Richard Dyott; William Wingfield	
Stafford	Sir John Ottley; Bulstrode Whitlock	
Newcastle under Lyme	Sir John Skeffington, 2nd Baronet; John Keeling	
Tamworth	Sir Thomas Puckering; Sir Walter Devereux	
=== Suffolk ===
Constituency	Members	Notes
Suffolk	Sir Robert Naunton; Sir Robert Crane	
Ipswich	Sir Robert Snelling; Sir William Yonge	
Dunwich	Sir John Rous; Thomas Bedingfield	
Orford	Robert Hitcham; Charles Croft	
Eye	Francis Finch; Sir Roger North	
Aldeburgh	Sir Thomas Glemham; William Mason	
Sudbury	Sir Nathaniel Barnardiston; Thomas Smith	
Bury St Edmunds	Sir Thomas Jermyn; Emanuel Gifford	
=== Surrey ===
Constituency	Members	Notes
Surrey	Sir Richard Onslow; Sir Ambrose Browne	
Southwark	Richard Yarward; William Coxe	
Bletchingley	Edward Bysshe; Henry Lovell	
Reigate	Thomas Bludder; Sir William Monson	
Guildford	Richard Shilton; Robert Parkhurst, jnr	Shilton did not take his seat, and was replaced by Sir William Morley
Gatton	Sir Samuel Owfield; Sir Charles Howard	
Haslemere	Sir Francis Carew; Poynings More	
=== Sussex ===
Constituency	Members	Notes
Sussex	Sir Walter Covert; Sir Alexander Temple	
Chichester	Algernon Lord Peircy; Humphrey Haggett	
Horsham	John Borough; John Middleton	
Midhurst	Richard Lewknor; Sir Henry Spiller	
Lewes	Sir George Goring; Sir George Rivers	
New Shoreham	John Alford; William Marlott	
Bramber	Walter Barttelot; Thomas Bowyer	
Steyning	Sir Edward Fraunceys; Edward Bishopp	
East Grinstead	Sir Henry Compton; Robert Goodwin	
Arundel	Nicholas Jordain; William Mill	
=== Warwickshire ===
Constituency	Members	Notes
Warwickshire	Sir Thomas Lucy; Sir Clement Throckmorton	
Coventry	Henry Harwell; Isaac Walden	
Warwick	Sir Francis Leigh, Bt. Francis Lucy	
=== Westmorland ===
Constituency	Members	Notes
Westmoreland	Sir John Lowther; Sir Henry Bellingham	
Appleby	Sir William Slingsby; William Ashton	
=== Wiltshire ===
Constituency	Members	Notes
Wiltshire	Sir Henry Poole; Sir Walter Long	
Salisbury	Henry Sherfield; John Puxton	
Wilton	Sir Thomas Morgan; Sir John Evelyn	
Downton	Edward Herbert; Sir William Trumbull	
Hindon	Sir Thomas Thynne; Thomas Lambert	
Heytesbury	Sir Charles Berkeley; William Blake	
Westbury	Sir Walter Long; Thomas Hopton	
Calne	Sir John Eyres; George Lowe (senior)	
Chippenham	Sir Edmund Bayntun; Sir Francis Popham	
Devizes	Robert Long; Sir Henry Ley	
Malmesbury	Sir Henry Moody; Sir William Crofts	
Cricklade	Sir William Howard; Sir Robert Hyde	
Ludgershall	Sir William Walter; Sir Thomas Jaye/Sir Thomas Hinton	Unresolved double return - BW corrigenda includes Jaye
Great Bedwyn	John Selden; Sir Maurice Berkeley	
Old Sarum	Michael Oldisworth; Sir Benjamin Rudyerd	BW corrigenda gives Christopher Keightley in place of Rudyerd
Wootton Bassett	Sir John Francklyn; Sir Thomas Lake	
Marlborough	Richard Digges; Edward Kyrton	
=== Worcestershire ===
Constituency	Members	Notes
Worcestershire	Sir Thomas Lyttelton, 1st Baronet; Sir John Rouse	
Worcester	John Spelman; John Haselock	
Droitwich	John Wilde; Thomas Coventry	
Evesham	Sir John Hare; Anthony Langston	
Bewdley	Ralph Clare	
=== Yorkshire ===
Constituency	Members	Notes
Yorkshire	Sir John Savile; Sir William Constable	
York	Sir Arthur Ingram; Christopher Brooke	
Kingston upon Hull	John Lister; Lancelot Roper	
Knaresborough	Sir Richard Hutton; Henry Benson	
Scarborough	Sir Hugh Cholmeley, 1st Baronet; Stephen Hutchinson	
Ripon	Thomas Best; Sir Thomas Posthumous Hoby	
Richmond	Christopher Wandesford; Matthew Hutton	
Hedon	Sir Thomas Fairfax; Sir Christopher Hillyard	
Boroughbridge	Sir Ferdinando Fairfax; Philip Mainwaring	
Thirsk	Henry Belasyse; William Cholmeley	
Aldborough	Richard Aldborough; John Carvile	
Beverley	Sir John Hotham Bt; Sir William Alford	
Pontefract	Sir John Jackson; Sir Francis Foljambe, 1st Baronet	
=== Cinque Ports ===
Constituency	Members	Notes
Hastings	Sir Dudley Carleton; Nicholas Eversfield	Carleton ennobled and replaced 1626 by Sir Thomas Parker
Romney	Richard Godfrey; Thomas Brett	
Hythe	Sir Peter Heyman; Sir Basil Dixwell, 1st Baronet	
Dover	John Hippisley; John Pringle	
Sandwich	Sir John Suckling; Peter Peake	Suckling chose to sit for Norwich, replaced by Sir Edward Boys
Rye	Thomas Fotherley; Sir John Sackville	
Winchelsea	Roger Twysden; Sir Nicholas Saunders	
=== Wales ===
Constituency	Members	Notes
Anglesey	Richard Bulkeley	
Beaumaris	Charles Jones	
Brecknockshire	John Price	
Brecknock	Walter Pye	chose for Herefordshire - replaced by Humphrey Lynde
Cardiganshire	James Lewis	
Cardigan	Walter Overbury	
Carmarthenshire	(Sir) Richard Vaughan	
Carmarthen	Henry Vaughan	
Carnarvonshire	John Griffith	
Carnarvon	Edward Littleton	
Denbighshire	Sir Eubule Thelwall	
Denbigh Boroughs	Hugh Myddleton	
Flintshire	John Salusbury	
Flint	William Ravenscroft	
Glamorgan	Sir John Stradling, 1st Baronet	
Cardiff	William Price	
Merioneth	Edward Vaughan	
Montgomeryshire	Sir William Herbert	
Montgomery	Sir Henry Herbert	
Pembrokeshire	John Wogan	
Pembroke	Hugh Owen	
Haverford West	Sir Thomas Canon	
Radnorshire	James Price	
Radnor	Charles Price	

== See also ==
- List of parliaments of England
- 2nd Parliament of King Charles I
