= Richard Molyneux =

Richard Molyneux may refer to:

- Richard le Molyneux (fl. 1312), MP for Lancashire
- Richard Molyneux (died 1397) (1368–1397), MP for Lancashire
- Sir Richard Molyneux, 1st Baronet (1560–1622), MP for Lancashire
- Richard Molyneux, 1st Viscount Molyneux (1594–1636), MP for Lancashire and Wigan
- Richard Molyneux, 2nd Viscount Molyneux (died 1654), Royalist officer in the English Civil War
- Dick Molyneux (1858–1906), association football manager
