= List of people from Tameside =

This is a list of famous and infamous people from Tameside, a metropolitan borough in North West England. This list includes people from the towns of Ashton-under-Lyne, Audenshaw, Denton, Droylsden, Dukinfield, Hyde, Longdendale, Mossley and Stalybridge, and the smaller villages that make up Tameside. This list is arranged alphabetically by surname.

Table of contents:
A B C D E F G H I J K L M N O P Q R S T U V W X Y Z
See also • References

== A ==
- Dawn Acton (born 1977): actress, Tracy Barlow in Coronation Street; born in Ashton-under-Lyne
- Harry Allen (executioner) (1911–1992)
- The Ashton family of Ashton-Under-Lyne, including
  - Ralph de Ashton
  - Robert de Ashton (died 1385)
  - John de Ashton (died 1428)
  - Thomas de Ashton (alchemist)

== B ==
- Amanda Barrie (born 1935): actress, Alma Sedgwick in Coronation Street; born in Ashton-under-Lyne
- Margaret Beckett (born 1943): Britain's first female Foreign Secretary (2006)
- Ross Brawn (born 1954): Formula One team technical director/team principal 1991–2006, 2008-2013 and Formula One Managing Director (2017–present)
- Mary Ann Britland (1847–1886): convicted murderer, and first woman hanged at Strangeways Prison; lived in Ashton-under-Lyne
- Arthur Brooke (1845–1918): founder of Brooke Bond and Co tea company
- Victor Brox (born 1940): blues musician; born in Ashton-under-Lyne

== C ==
- Zach Clough (b. 1995): Professional footballer currently playing for Adelaide United F.C. Previously of Bolton Wanderers FC, Nottingham Forest FC and Wigan Athletic FC. Born and raised in Denton, Greater Manchester.
- Henry Cockburn (1923–2004): footballer; played mid-fielder and was capped by England 13 times; in a 14-year playing career, played for Manchester United F.C. and Bury F.C.; born in Ashton-under-Lyne
- Tom Cassell (b. 1993): YouTuber and twitch streamer associated with Call of Duty Zombies, Minecraft and IRL vlogging. Born and raised in Gee Cross, Greater Manchester

== D ==
- Howard Donald: member of popular boy band Take That lived in Droylsden.
- Robert Duckenfield (1619–1689): military commander in Civil War; High Sheriff of Cheshire

== E ==
- Thomas Earnshaw (1749–1829): late 18th-century watchmaker, born in Ashton-under-Lyne

== F ==
- George Formby Snr (1875–1921): born James Lawler Booth; music hall entertainer; father of the music hall and cinema star George Formby; born in Ashton-under-Lyne
- Ronald Fraser (1930–1997): film actor, born in Ashton-under-Lyne

== G ==
- Tony Gardner (born 1964): actor; known for playing Brian Johnson in My Parents are Aliens; born in Ashton-under-Lyne

== H ==
- Stephen Hampson (born 1968), cricketer.
- Andrew Harris (born 1973): cricketer who played for Derbyshire and Nottinghamshire, and currently plays for Leicestershire; born in Ashton-under-Lyne
- Simon Hoggart (1946–2014): journalist and broadcaster, born in Ashton-under-Lyne
- Matthew Hughes (born 1950): politician, born in Audenshaw; Was the distinguished Principal of John Septamus Roe in Perth who grew the school from a small school in Mirrabooka to the largest private school in the state of WA. Matthew went on to become the first Labor party Member of the Legislative Assembly for the electorate of Kalamunda.
- Lisa Huo: Big Brother contestant in 2006
- Geoff Hurst (born 1941): retired footballer; spent most of his career playing for West Ham United F.C.; part of England's World Cup winning team in 1966; one of two to have scored a hat-trick in a World Cup final; born in Ashton-under-Lyne

== L ==
- John Lees: cricketer
- Evan Leigh: 19th-century author, inventor and engineer, born in Ashton-under-Lyne
- Lonelady: 21st-century singer and guitarist, real name Julie Campbell, comes from Audenshaw
- John Lees: Body builder and professional wrestler. Mr Universe 1957. born 1930 in Stalybridge.

== M ==
- Hugh Mason (1817–1886): mill owner and politician; owned textile mills in Ashton-under-Lyne MP for Ashton-under-Lyne; advocate of paternalism for workers, Irish home rule, and women's suffrage; born in Stalybridge
- F. W. Micklethwaite (1849–1925): photographer
- Albert Monks (1875–1936), professional footballer
- Justin Moorhouse (1970): comedian from Ashton-under-Lyne
- Lily Murphy (2006), professional footballer

== P ==
- Stephen Parry (born 1986): Lancashire and England cricketer
- Simone Perrotta (born 1977): footballer; part of Italy's 2006 World Cup-winning team; born in Ashton-under-Lyne
- John Louis Petit (1801–1868): antiquarian who drew examples of the architecture and landscape of Lancashire; born in Ashton-under-Lyne and
- Harry Pilling (born 1943): played first-class cricket, 1962–1980; born in Ashton-under-Lyne
- Robert Platt (1802–1882): cotton manufacturer and philanthropist; born in Stalybridge
- David Potts (born 1957): CEO, Morrisons

== R ==
- Albert E. Richardson: clockmaker who designed the Teasmade
- Mark Robins (born 1969): former footballer who was the former manager of Coventry City F.C.; born in Ashton-under-Lyne
- Sunny Rogers (1913–2005): comedian, pianist and actress

== S ==
- Charles Roger Slack, plant biologist and biochemist (born 1937), Ashton Under Lyne
- Robert Sheldon, Baron Sheldon of Ashton-under-Lyne (born 1923): politician
- Melanie Sykes: television, radio presenter and model (born 1970), Ashton Under Lyne
- Kathy Staff (1928–2008): actress best known for her role as Nora Batty in 'Last of the Summer Wine' Born in Dukinfield.
- Francis Thompson poet lived from 1864 to 1885 in Ashton-under-Lyne

== V ==
- David Vaughan (1944–2003): artist; attended art school in Ashton-under-Lyne; lived in Tameside
- Brooke Vincent (born 1992): actress, Sophie Webster in Coronation Street; born in Audenshaw

== W ==
- Brian Wilde (1927–2008): actor; known for roles in Last of the Summer Wine and Porridge; born in Ashton before he moved with his family at a young age
- Sean Wilson (born 1965): actor, Martin Platt in Coronation Street; born in Ashton-under-Lyne
- Lewis Wright, Baron Wright of Ashton-under-Lyne (1903–1974): President of the Trades Union Congress; lived in Ashton-under-Lyne from 1940 until his death in 1974; commemorated by a blue plaque there

== Y ==
- Gary Yates (born 1967): cricketer; played first-class cricket for Lancashire, 1990–2002; coaches the Lancashire second XI; born in Ashton-under-Lyne

== Others ==
Other footballers who were born in Ashton-under-Lyne include Trevor Ross, Alan Wright, Gordon Taylor, and Bert Whalley, who died in the 1958 Munich air disaster.

Several Coronation Street actors are also associated with Ashton-Under-Lyne; Bill Tarmey, Roy Barraclough, and Sue Devaney have all lived in the town.

== See also ==
- List of people from Greater Manchester
