= Cuthbert Halsall =

English politician

Sir Cuthbert Halsall (died 1619) was an English politician who sat in the House of Commons in 1614.

Halsall was the eldest son of Richard Halsall of Halsall and his wife Ann Barlow, daughter of Alexander Barlow. He served with the Earl of Essex in Ireland and was knighted by the Earl at Dublin on 22 July 1599. He owned property at Halsall and Salwick, Lancashire and was Sheriff of Lancashire for 1601 and 1612.

In 1614, he was elected Member of Parliament for Lancashire in the Addled Parliament.

Halsall married Dorothy, daughter of Henry Stanley, 4th Earl of Derby.

Parliament of England
Preceded by Sir Richard Molyneux; Sir Richard Hoghton	Member of Parliament for Lancashire; 1614; With: Sir Thomas Gerard, 1st Baronet	Succeeded by Sir John Ratcliffe; Sir Gilbert Hoghton
