= Robert Worsley =

Robert Worsley may refer to:

- Robert Worsley (MP for Lancashire) (died 1402), English politician
- Sir Robert Worsley (died 1585), MP for Lancashire
- Sir Robert Worsley (MP for Callington) (died 1604/5), English politician
- Sir Robert Worsley, 3rd Baronet (1643–1675), English politician
- Sir Robert Worsley, 4th Baronet (c. 1669–1747), English politician
