= Richard le Molyneux =

English politician

Richard le Molyneux (fl. 1312) was an English politician.

Le Molyneux represented the constituency of Lancashire in 1312.

Parliament of England
Preceded by William le Gentil; Thomas de Betham	Member of Parliament for Lancashire; 1312; With: Henry de Trafford	Succeeded by William de Bradshaigh; Edmund de Daere
