= Thomas Radcliffe =

Thomas Radcliffe or Thomas Radclyffe may refer to:

- Thomas Radcliffe (MP died 1403), MP in 1385 and 1395, for Lancashire
- Thomas Radcliffe (MP died 1440) MP in May 1421, 1423 and 1433, for Lancashire
- Thomas Radclyffe, 3rd Earl of Sussex (c. 1525 – 1583), MP for Norfolk
- Thomas Radcliffe (MP for Portsmouth), in 1586, MP for Portsmouth
- Thomas Radcliffe (Irish politician) (1715–1776), MP for St Canice
- Thomas Radclyffe (fl. 1817–1860) younger brother, colleague and business partner of the engraver William Radclyffe
- Thomas Walter Radcliffe (b. 1966), actor in The Bill, Inspector Morse, etc.
