= Thomas Stanley =

Thomas Stanley may refer to:

== Politicians ==
- Thomas Stanley (fl. 1382), Chancellor of the Duchy of Lancaster
- Thomas Stanley, 1st Baron Stanley (c. 1405–1459), English politician
- Thomas Stanley (15th-century MP), MP for Lancashire, 1433
- Thomas Stanley (Lancashire MP, died 1571), MP for Liverpool, 1547, and Bossiney, 1558
- Sir Thomas Stanley (Lancashire MP, died 1576) (1532/33–1576), Sheriff and MP for Lancashire, 1571
- Thomas Stanley (Cheshire MP), MP for Cheshire, 1571
- Thomas Stanley (Maidstone MP) (1581–1669), MP for Maidstone, 1624 and 1625
- Sir Thomas Stanley of Grangegorman (1626–1674), knighted by Henry Cromwell in 1659
- Sir Thomas Stanley, 4th Baronet (1670–1714), British MP for Preston, 1695–1698
- Thomas Stanley (Lancashire MP, born 1749), MP for Lancashire, 1780–1812
- Thomas Stanley (Lancashire MP, born 1753), MP for Lancashire, 1776–1779
- Thomas B. Stanley (1890–1970), governor of Virginia, 1954–1958
- Thomas M. Stanley, American politician in the Massachusetts House of Representatives

== Others ==
- Thomas Stanley, 1st Earl of Derby (1435–1504), English aristocrat
- Thomas Stanley, 2nd Earl of Derby (bef. 1485–1521), English aristocrat
- Thomas Stanley (bishop) (1510–1568), bishop of Sodor and Man
- Thomas Stanley (Royal Mint) (died 1571), English officer of the Mint
- Thomas Stanley (puritan) (c. 1610–1670), English puritan
- Thomas Stanley (author) (1625–1678), English author and translator
- Thomas J. Stanley (1944–2015), American author
- Thomas E. Stanley, Dallas-based American architect
