= Matthew Redman =

Matthew Redman may refer to:

- Mathew de Redman (fl.1294-1307), MP for Lancashire
- Matt Redman, English Christian worship leader, songwriter and author
