= Thomas Langton (disambiguation) =

Thomas Langton was a churchman.

Thomas Langton may also refer to:

- Thomas Langton (died 1605), MP for Newton (UK Parliament constituency)
- Thomas Langton (died 1569), MP for Lancashire

== See also ==
- Thomas Langton Church, Canadian politician
