= Sir Richard Hoghton, 1st Baronet =

English politician

Sir Richard Hoghton, 1st Baronet (28 September 1570 – 1630) was a politician who sat in the House of Commons between 1601 and 1611.

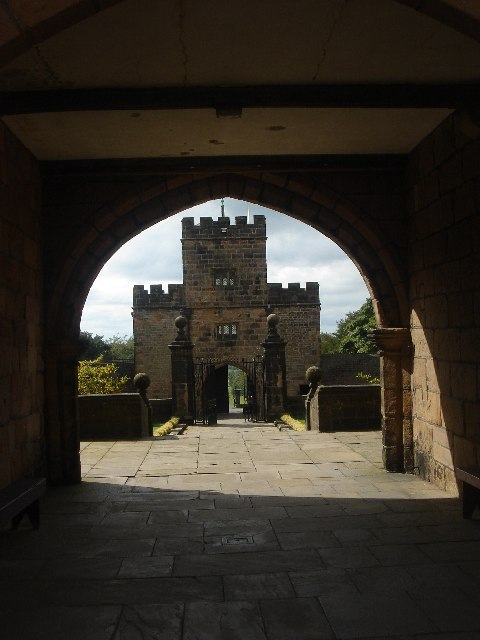
Hoghton Tower.

He was born the eldest son of Thomas Hoghton of Hoghton Tower, Lancashire by Anne, the daughter of Henry Keighley of Keighley, Yorkshire. Thomas was killed in family feud in 1589.

He was appointed High Sheriff of Lancashire for 1599 and was knighted in January 1600. In 1601 he was elected Member of Parliament (MP) for Lancashire and was re-elected MP for Lancashire in 1604.

Houghton was one of the first ten baronets created, on 22 May 1611.

Hoghton had alum works which James VI and I visited on 16 August 1617 returning from his Scottish progress. In November 1617, when Hoghton was in a dispute with Sir Robert Bannister, Francis Bacon and the Earl of Suffolk advised King James that Hoghton's alum would compete with a royal venture, and so the king should compensate him.

Sir Richard was a suspected Crypto-Catholic.

Hoghton died in 1630. He had married firstly Catherine, the daughter of Sir Gilbert Gerard with whom he had five sons and eight daughters, and secondly Jane, the daughter of Thomas Spencer of Rufford and widow of Robert Hesketh, with whom he had two more sons. The baronetcy was inherited by his eldest son Gilbert.

Parliament of England
Preceded by Sir Thomas Gerard; Robert Hesketh	Member of Parliament for Lancashire; 1601–1611; With: Thomas Hesketh 1601; Sir Richard Molyneux 1604–1611	Succeeded by Sir Thomas Gerard, Bt; Sir Cuthbert Halsall
Baronetage of England
New creation	Baronet (of Hoghton Tower); 1611–1630	Succeeded by Gilbert Hoghton
