= Thomas Walmsley (died 1637) =

English politician

Sir Thomas Walmsley (died 13 July 1637) was an English politician who sat in the House of Commons between 1621 and 1624.

Walmsley was the son of Thomas Walmesley of Dunkenhalgh and grandson of Sir Thomas Walmsley Justice of Common Pleas. He was knighted on 11 August 1617. In 1621, he was elected Member of Parliament for Clitheroe. He was elected MP for Lancashire in 1624.

Walmsley predeceased his father in 1637.

Parliament of England
Preceded by Sir Gilbert Hoghton, 2nd Baronet; Clement Coke	Member of Parliament for Clitheroe; 1621; With: William Fanshawe	Succeeded by William Fanshawe; Ralph Whitfield
Preceded by Sir John Ratcliffe; Sir Gilbert Hoghton	Member of Parliament for Lancashire; 1624; With: Sir John Ratcliffe	Succeeded by Sir Richard Molyneux, Bt; Sir John Ratcliffe
