= Richard Molyneux (died 1397) =

English politician

Richard Molyneux (c. 1368 – 27 December 1397), of Sefton, Lancashire, was an English politician.

== Family ==
Molyneux was the eldest son and heir of Sir William Molyneux of Sefton who died in 1372. His mother was Agnes Hoghton, daughter of MP Sir Adam Hoghton of Hoghton. Agnes was the widow of Sir Thomas Banaster. Molyneux's second wife was Ellen, daughter of MP, Sir Robert Urswyk, by whom he had two sons and one daughter.

== Career ==
He was a Member (MP) of the Parliament of England for Lancashire in January 1397.

Parliament of England
| Preceded by Robert Urswyk; Thomas Radcliffe | Member of Parliament for Lancashire; Jan. 1397; With: Robert Urswyk | Succeeded by John le Boteler; Ralph Radcliffe |
