= Sir Thomas Gerard, 1st Baronet =

Member of the Parliament of England

Sir Thomas Gerard, 1st Baronet (1560 – 16 February 1621) was an English politician who sat in the House of Commons at various times between 1597 and 1621.

== Early life and education ==
Gerard was the son of Sir Thomas Gerard, of Bryn Hall and his wife Elizabeth Port, daughter of Sir John Port, of Etwall, Derbyshire. His brother Fr. John Gerard, was later ordained a Roman Catholic priest of the Society of Jesus and operated an underground ministry in Elizabethan England. Thomas Gerard matriculated at Brasenose College, Oxford on 20 July 1578, aged 18. In 1579 he was a student of the Inner Temple. His parents and brother John were Catholics and he was tutored by a Catholic. His first wife Cecily was "a recusant and indicted thereof" and he employed a "notorious recusant" to educate his child and was described as "of evil affection in religion" in 1590.

Gerard was involved in an unfortunate incident in July 1583. He and wife were looking after a young Lancashire heiress Suzanne Abraham. A fencing master who was a relation of the girl invited them to a house in London near Cecil House. While the rest of the women were playing cards, the wife of the fencing master took Suzanne Abraham upstairs where she was secretly married to a stranger to gain her fortune. Recorder Fleetwood was appalled at the case.

== Career ==
Nevertheless, in 1597, he was elected Member of Parliament for Liverpool. He succeeded his father to the family estates in September 1601. He was knighted on 18 April 1603. When the order of baronet was first instituted on 22 May 1611, he was created a baronet and the £1,000, that was due to the Crown for such creation, was returned in consideration of his Father's sufferings in the cause of the King's mother Mary, Queen of Scots. In 1614 he was elected MP for Lancashire. He was elected MP for Wigan in 1621.

== Personal life ==
Gerard married firstly Cecily Maney, daughter of Sir Walter Maney, of Staplehurst in about 1580, with whom he had a son and heir Thomas. He married secondly, after 1606, Mary Lee, widow of Sir Robert Lee, Lord Mayor of London, and formerly of William Smith, of London and daughter of Sir James Hawes who was also Lord Mayor. His third wife was Mary Uvedale, widow of Sir Edward Uvedale and formerly of the Hon. Anthony Browne and daughter of Sir William Dormer, of Wing, Buckinghamshire. He had no children by his second and third wives.

== Death ==
Gerard died at the age of about 60 and was buried at St Margaret's, Westminster, on 16 February 1621.

Parliament of England
Preceded by Michael Doughty; John Wroth	Member of Parliament for Liverpool; 1597; With: Peter Probie	Succeeded by Edward Anderson; Hugh Calverley
Preceded by Sir Richard Molyneux; Sir Richard Hoghton	Member of Parliament for Lancashire; 1614; With: Sir Cuthbert Halsall	Succeeded by Sir John Ratcliffe; Sir Gilbert Hoghton
Preceded by Gilbert Gerard; Sir Richard Molyneux	Member of Parliament for Wigan; 1621; With: Roger Downes	Succeeded by Sir Anthony St John; Roger Downes
Baronetage of England
New creation	Baronet (of Bryn); 1611–1621	Succeeded by Thomas Gerard
