= Alexander Radcliffe =

17th-century English politician

Sir Alexander Radcliffe (1608 – April 1654) was an English politician who sat in the House of Commons from 1628 to 1629. He supported the Royalist cause in the English Civil War.

Radcliffe was the son of Sir John Radcliffe of Ordsall Lancashire. He inherited estates at Tockholes, but lost them in 1641 during the Civil War.

He was appointed Knight of the Order of the Bath in 1625, when he was seventeen years old. In 1628, he was elected Member of Parliament for Lancashire and sat until 1629 when King Charles decided for eleven years to rule without parliament.

Radcliffe supported the King in the Civil War and in 1642 he executed a Commissioner of Array. He was later committed to the Tower of London by Parliament for assisting the Earl of Derby in the Siege of Manchester.

Radcliffe died at the age of 46.

Parliament of England
Preceded by Robert Stanley; Sir Gilbert Hoghton	Member of Parliament for Lancashire; 1628–1629; With: Sir Richard Molyneux	Parliament suspended until 1640
