= Ralph Assheton (general) =

English politician

Ralph Assheton (1596 – 17 February 1650) was an English politician who sat in the House of Commons from 1640 to 1649. He was a general in the Parliamentary army in the English Civil War.

Assheton was eldest son of Sir Richard Assheton of Middleton (who died 1618) and a descendant of Ralph de Ashton of Middleton. He was admitted at Sidney Sussex College, Cambridge on 22 May 1614 and was also admitted at Gray's Inn on 24 May 1614. He was awarded MA at Cambridge in 1615 on the visit of the King, and was incorporated at Oxford University in 1616.

In November 1640, Assheton was elected MP for Lancashire in the Long Parliament. He was an energetic supporter of parliament and the avowed leader of the Presbyterian party in Lancashire. In the Civil War he became a colonel-general in the parliamentary army and was commander in chief of the parliamentary forces in Lancashire. He was excluded from parliament in 1648.

Assheton died aged 54. His monumental brass in the Church of St Leonard, Middleton is the only brass in the UK of a Civil War officer in full armour.

Assheton's eldest son, Sir Ralph Assheton, 1st Baronet of Middleton, was created a baronet after the restoration.

Parliament of England
Preceded by Sir Gilbert Hoghton, 2nd Baronet; William Farrington	Member of Parliament for Lancashire; 1640–1648; With: Roger Kirkby 1640–1642; Sir Richard Hoghton, 3rd Baronet 1646–1648	Succeeded by Sir Richard Hoghton, 3rd Baronet
