= John Pilkington =

John Pilkington may refer to:

- John Carteret Pilkington, Irish singer and writer
- John Pilkington (priest), List of Archdeacons of Durham
- John de Pilkington, MP for Lancashire
- Johnny Pilkington, Irish hurler
