= John Southworth =

John Southworth is the name of:

- John Southworth (MP) (died 1595), MP for Lancashire
- Saint John Southworth (1592–1654), English martyr and Roman Catholic saint
- John Southworth (musician) (born 1972), Canadian pop singer-songwriter
- Jack Southworth (late 19th century), English footballer
