= Thomas Travers =

Thomas Travers may refer to:

- Thomas Otho Travers (1785–1844), soldier
- Thomas Travers (MP), for Lancashire
- Sir Thomas Travers (ophthalmologist), Australian ophthalmologist
- Tom Travers, a fictional character in the Jeeves stories
