= Thomas Urswyk =

English politician

Thomas Urswyk (fl. 1402–1443) was an English politician. He sat as MP for Lancashire in May 1421 and 1422.

== Offices held ==
He also served as commissioner to make an arrest in Lancashire in 1410, commissioner of array in March 1430, commissioner to assess persons liable for taxation in April 1431, master forester of Amounderness, Quernmore and Wyresdale from 1 July 1413 till 10 November 1443, receiver of the duchy estates in Lancashire and Cheshire from 24 November 1417 till 10 November 1443, chief baron of the duchy exchequer in Lancaster from 1436 till 10 November 1443, justice of the peace of Lancashire in March 1418, August 1426, December 1435, March 1436, February 1437, and March 1440 till after May 1441, collector of taxes in Lancashire in April 1431 and January 1436, and deputy to Thomas Chaucer, chief butler of England, in Liverpool till December 1422.

== Family ==
He was the second son of Sir Robert Urswyk and his second wife Ellen. By April 1405, he married a woman named Joan and had at least one son and one daughter.
