= Thomas Boteler =

Thomas Boteler may refer to:

- Sir Thomas Boteler Church of England High School
- Thomas Boteler (MP)
