= Sir Thomas Gerard, 2nd Baronet =

English landowner and politician

Sir Thomas Gerard, 2nd Baronet (c. 1584 – 15 May 1630) was an English landowner and politician who sat in the House of Commons in 1624.

Gerard was the son of Sir Thomas Gerard, 1st Baronet of Bryn and of Etwall and his wife Cecily Maney, daughter of Sir Walter Maney, of Staplehurst. He succeeded to the baronetcy on the death of his father in February 1621. In 1624, he was elected member of parliament for Liverpool.

== Personal life ==
Sir Thomas married, firstly, Frances Molyneux (died 1626), daughter of Sir Richard Molyneux, 1st Baronet of Sefton in 1610. They had seven sons and three daughters; their son William became 3rd Baronet and died 7 April 1681. He married, secondly, Dorothy Moore, widow of John Petre (died 1623); the couple had no children.

== Death ==
Gerard died in 1630 at the age of about 45.

Parliament of England
Preceded by Thomas May; William Johnson	Member of Parliament for Liverpool; 1624; With: George Ireland	Succeeded by James Lord Strange; Edward More
Baronetage of England
Preceded by Thomas Gerard	Baronet (of Bryn); 1621–1630	Succeeded by William Gerard
