= Richard Nowell =

Richard Nowell may refer to:

- Richard Nowell (cricketer) (born 1975), English cricketer
- Richard Nowell (MP) (fl. 1354), English politician
- Richard Nowell, see Pea galaxy#History of discovery
