= Marks (manor house) =

Former manor house in London, England

Coordinates: 51°35′1.22″N 0°8′33.23″E

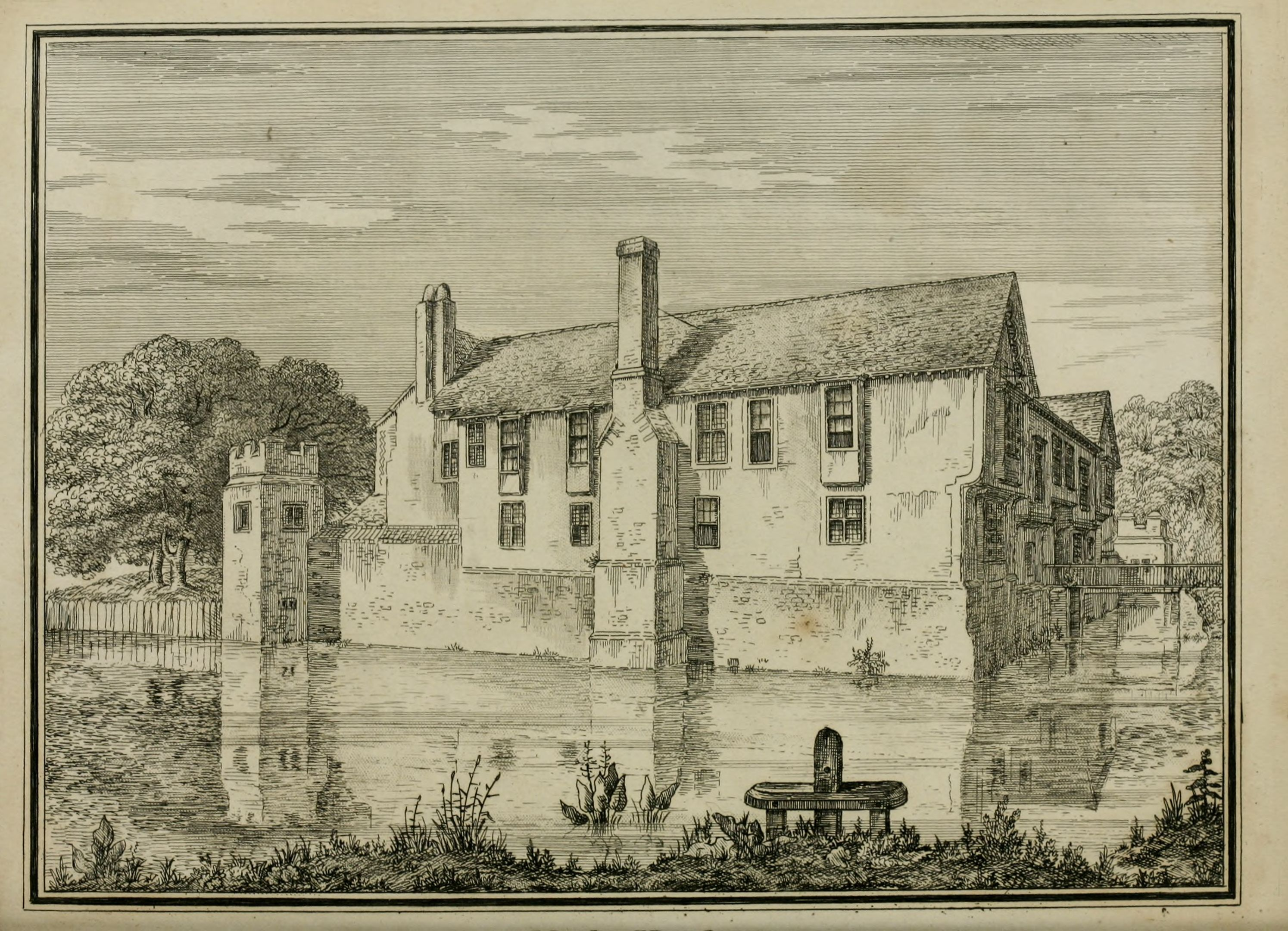
Marks Manor House from Lysons (1792)

Marks (or Mark's Hall) was a manor house located near Marks Gate at the northern tip of the London Borough of Barking and Dagenham in London, England, the house standing on what is now Warren Hall Farm, about two miles west of Romford. The name Marks (historically Markes) is believed to have been derived from the de Merk family who built the original manor in the 14th century. The manor house was demolished in 1808.

== History ==
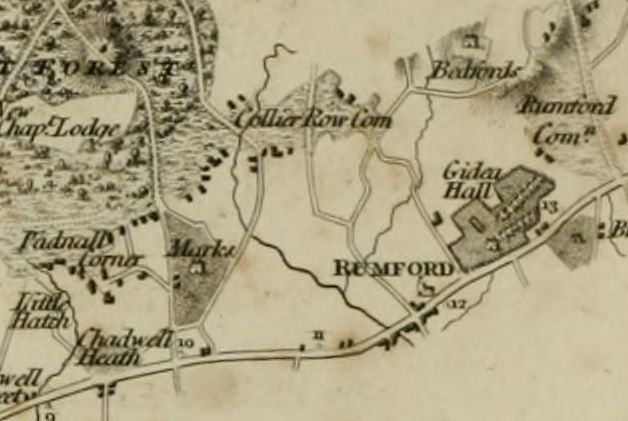
Map showing location of Marks, from Lysons (1792))

The manor lay partly in the parish of Dagenham and partly in the Liberty of Havering with notable burials and marriages being carried out in the parish church in Romford, located in the market place. The origins of the manor can be traced back to the de Merk family, with Simon de Merk recorded in 1330 and Robert de Merk in 1352, although the first record of a house on this site is in 1386. While originally constructed by the de Merk family the manor had changed hands and in the middle of the 15th century was held by Thomas Urswick, Recorder of London. The boundary between Dagenham and Havering was altered to bring the manor house within the Liberty of Havering that was established in 1465. As the four sons of Urswick predeceased him it again changed hands and was owned by the Heton Family in 1488 and was still in the same family in 1556 when the manor was described as having 3 messuages, 300 acres land, 80 acres meadow, 200 acres pasture, 60 acres wood located variously in the parishes of Havering, Hornchurch, Dagenham and Barking. The owners, Thomas and Elizabeth Hales, sold the manor in 1557 to James Bacon and in 1584 it was claimed by Lady Anne Bacon and granted by her to her son Francis Bacon. However a survey made for him soon after this describes the building as "a great house in decay" and there does not seem to be any evidence that Francis Bacon ever resided at Marks, so that by 1589 George Hervey had been installed as tenant, going on to purchase the manor outright in 1596 for £1500.

On his death in 1605 Sir George Hervey bequeathed 'the Manor of Marks in Hornchurch in the Liberty of Havering-atte-Bower held freehold' to his son Sir Gawyn Hervie, Knight who lived there until his death in 1627. An illustration titled 'Marks House' showing a moated Elizabethan house probably dates from around this time, and a map dated 1618 shows Marks house as being just within the Liberty of Havering with a windmill nearby to the East. Gawen Hervey left the manor to his nephew Carew Hervey Mildmay, and as he was a Parliamentary commander in the Civil War Marks was attacked in June 1648 by Royalists on their way to Chelmsford, although the house remained in the family as a document of 1652 is signed by Carew Mildmay of Marks. In 1666 the manor consisted of the main manor house with outbuildings, a yard, gardens and an orchard. The manor then passed down the Mildmay family for at least three generations, and was held by Carew Hervey Mildmay when he was High Sheriff of Essex in 1712, being the great-grandson of the original Carew Mildmay. On his death he left his property, including Marks, to his daughter Anne, but when she died a spinster the property was inherited by Sir Henry St John-Mildmay.

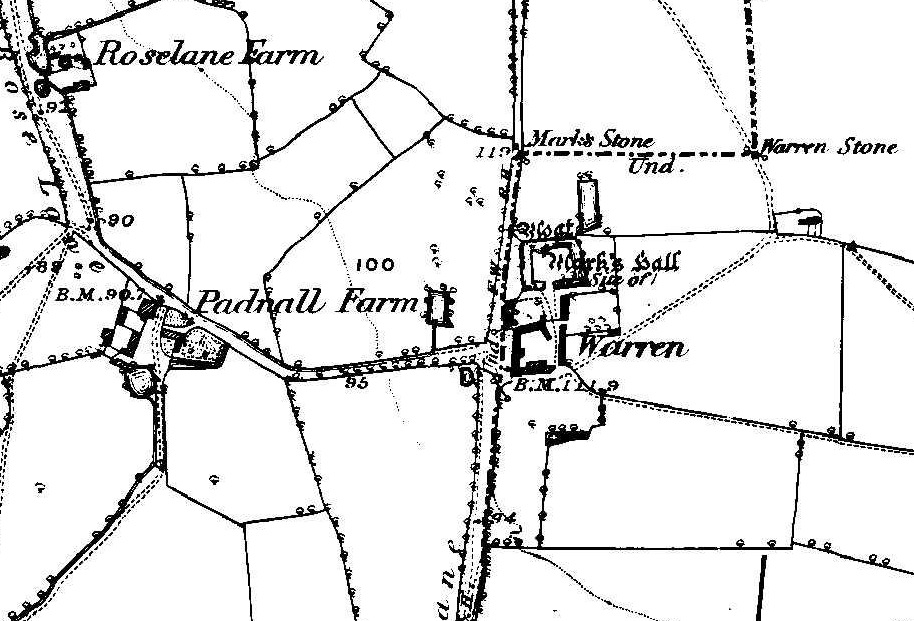
"Site of Mark's Hall" shown on a late 19th-century Ordnance Survey map

While the manor house itself was demolished in 1808, the windmill associated with the Manor, a smock mill known as Drake's Mill and one of the tallest in Essex, was not demolished until 1920.

The site of the former manor house was transferred from the London Borough of Havering to the London Borough of Barking and Dagenham on 1 April 1994.

An extensive collection of archives of the estate is held by the National Archives.
