= Nicholas Atherton =

14th-century English soldier, administrator, knight and politician

Sir Nicholas Atherton (c.1357-1420) of Atherton. Other titles; Nicholas de Atherton, Lord of Bickerstaffe. English politician and Member of parliament (MP) of the Parliament of England for Lancashire in 1401. A lifelong member of affinity who was knighted on the 27 October 1400 in York, and prorogued on 20 January 1401 in Westminster. Born into a position within the Lancashire gentry. Extensive service to the House of Lancaster. Bailiff and medieval tax collector.

It is unclear when Atherton was born. He was the second son of Sir William Atherton (c.1325-1389) and Joan Mobberley of Mobberley, Cheshire. His father was a Member of Parliament, and represented the County of Lancashire on two occasions. Nicholas Atherton was expected to marry into a family of equal standing, since tradition dictated that his elder brother, Sir William Atherton (c.1355-1414) would inherit the landed estate, the ancestral family seat of Atherton Hall, then a medieval moated lodge.

As a young boy he would have inevitably trained in the art of warfare, since his father, a knight, expected him to fulfil a life service, as a retainer to the second Duke of Lancaster, John of Gaunt; one of England's principal military commanders in the 1370s and 1380s. A formal ceremonial event took place during March 1370; although records indicate that Atherton was already part of a military campaign the previous year, upon the resumption of war with the Kingdom of France in 1369.

Atherton's middle-ranking position involved the rendering of military, political, legal and domestic service, in return for money, office and influence. He proved himself loyal and devoted in his service to the Duchy of Lancaster as an indenture of retinue; also known as an affinity. He took part in various expeditions overseas, including four military campaigns in both Spain and France in 1369, 1370, 1372 and 1373, all in the name of Edward III, under the banner of John of Gaunt. The military campaign of 1370 in Aquitaine, included historical events such as the Siege of Limoges. A year later he would have been present at his ducal lordships marriage to Infanta Constance of Castile. The Duchess proved to be an important acquaintance or ally, that may have just saved him from being sentenced for the murder of a Lancastrian public official in 1377.

As part of the 1372 campaign John of Gaunt commanded Sir John le Boteler, Sheriff of Lancashire, as Knight of the shire and notable esquires Mawkyn de Rixton and William Bradshaw, to each muster 20 archers; whereas gentlemen, Robert de Pilkington, of the Manor of Rivington, and Nicholas de Atherton, son of a knight, were required to muster a minimum of 10 archers. Bowmen, as they were also known, were instrumental to military success during the Hundred Years' War. Mawkyn de Rixton, also went by the name of Mathew and was tasked to form a flotilla to sail from Liverpool.

During this period, Atherton became involved in a dispute over the murder of his friend Roger Hilton. Agnes the grieving widow, turned to Atherton to seek justice, as well as compensation. His patron, John of Gaunt, as arbitrator, favoured Atherton, his new retainer, of which typically numbered two hundred within the kingdom and realms, and awarded Atherton and the widow 120 marks (worth £80,000 in 2021). It is likely that Agnes was now his wife.

Some medieval historians regard his father as a criminal knight, alongside Sir William de Parre (d.1405), and described both Nicholas Atherton and his eldest son as troublesome, prone to extreme violence, more suited the battlefields of mainland Europe, but less so in the Duchy of Lancaster where it destabilised the peace.

Atherton was jailed for a time at Tutbury Castle, Staffordshire, for having failed to pay compensation to John Worthington the sum of 100 marks in damages. After sentencing from Godfrey de Foljambe he was relocated to Lancaster castle, where he remained until his release.

On the year of his marriage to the daughter of Adam Bickerstaffe, he was temporarily imprisoned in Marshalsea in 1377, for his involvement in the death of William Bredkirk, the Duke of Lancaster's county coroner. Instead of being tried by the Lancaster assises, he was released on bail paid by his father in law, who had previously appointed Bredkirk as Lancashire county coroner. Some might say he was proving loyalty, however it is difficult to comprehend his actions. Within a year he had received a royal pardon, which had been instrumented from the Savoy Palace, in part, by Constance of Castile, Duchess of Lancaster who he would have personally known since 1371. The details of the murder are unknown, however legal records survive and indicate that multiple members of the Atherton family were involved, and petitioned the king in the French language during 1381, after Atherton's own royal pardon.

Atherton took part in the expedition to Castile in 1385 in the name of Richard II, becoming a regular in the ducal household in the 1390's at Leicester Castle. To denote loyalty, Atherton would have worn a Lancaster livery collar or chain of office, known as the Collar of Esses. By this time both his father and father-in-law had died which would have elevated his position in society. However, Atherton was considered by the Duchy of Lancaster to be a troublesome man. Indictments were taken out against both him and his eldest son, Nicholas, for various acts including theft and murder. However, his loyalty to the Crown, and close connections with nobles, ensured leniency and repetitive avoidance of punishment.

His patron, John of Gaunt died during February 1399 and his son, Henry Bolingbroke was a perceived threat to Richard II who confiscated his lands. Atherton's allegiance to his new patron, Bolingbroke was first rewarded by his appointment as bailiff of the West Derby Hundred on 18 September 1399, just 12 days before Bolingbroke was formally crowned Henry IV of England, following the abdication and imprisonment of Richard II.

Atherton carried out the role of bailiff until his death a little over twenty years later. Atherton received a knighthood from the new king in 1400, along with an annuity of £10. The following year he was rewarded for his service to the House of Lancaster, by being chosen to represent the County of Lancashire in parliament at the Palace of Westminster in 1401. His final public role was as the tax collector for Lancashire which he performed from November 1404 to December 1407, an unpopular position given the introduction of the poll tax and in the aftermath of Peasants' Revolt a few years earlier.

== Personal ==
As a younger son, Atherton stood to gain very little family inheritance. He married Joan, the daughter of Adam Bickerstaffe or Bickerstath in 1377, and the manor of Bickerstaffe, became his adoptive home. They had 3 sons. Richard Scrope, Bishop of Lichfield granted him a licence for an oratory in his manor in September, 1389.

His son received a pardon for the murder of Robert le Walsh in 1401, which coincided with Atherton serving in parliament. His eldest, Nicholas, was part of the retinue of Henry V of England and served at the Battle of Agincourt. His son also provided 2 horse archers.

Atherton died in 1420. His last will and testament written and sealed in 1415 made a bequest to the four orders of friars, (known as the Dominicans, Franciscans, Augustinians and Carmelites), in addition to his offspring. His eldest son, Nicholas is listed. According to Burke's Peerage the manor of Bickerstaffe, in the parish of Ormskirk, passed onto his eldest son.

== Legacy ==
His son Nicholas was indentured in 1397 and survived him by just 4 years. In his final days he willed the manor of Bickerstaffe to trustees, since his son and heir, Henry Atherton was a child.

Thomas Atherton (died 1514), his great-grandson, was the last male legitimate descendant bearing his name, ending with his eldest daughter and heir, Margaret Atherton (1485-1516) who married James Scarisbrick. The manor of Bickerstaffe descended to the Earl of Derby.
