= William Banastre =

14th-century English politician

William Banastre (fl. 1305), was an English politician.

He was a member (MP) of the parliament of England for Lancashire in 1305.
