= Egbert de Haydock =

14th-century English politician

Egbert de Haydock (fl. 1300) was an English politician.

He was a member (MP) of the parliament of England for Lancashire in 1300.
