= William Farrington (Royalist) =

English politician

William Farrington (died 1659) was an English politician who sat in the House of Commons in 1640. He supported the Royalist cause in the English Civil War.

Farrington was the son of Thomas Farrington and grandson of William Farrington of Worden, Lancashire, an estate which the family had held since the time of Edward III. His grandfather left him the estate at Worden in 1610, cutting out his father who was said to have been a spendthrift. Farrington also purchased the manor of Leyland in 1617.

He was secretary to Lord Strange. In 1636 he was appointed High Sheriff of Lancashire and in April 1640 elected Member of Parliament for Lancashire in the Short Parliament.

In the Civil War, he was appointed a commissioner of array, reported by the Parliamentarians as one of "the most busy and active" and made colonel of the newly raised Lancashire Militia. In 1642 his servant, William Sumner, captured a stock of gunpowder at Preston and Farrington accompanied Lord Strange to the siege of Manchester. He was principal adviser of the Countess during her defence of Lathom House against Parliamentary forces in the Siege of Lathom House and in consequence his estate was sequestered by parliament. He was made a prisoner in 1646, after which he compounded for his estates and took no further part in the wars.

Farrington died in 1659, three years after his father who had died at the age of 90. He had married Margaret, the daughter of Henry Worrell and left 3 sons and 3 daughters. He was succeeded by his eldest son William who also fought in the Royalist cause and was awarded the title of Knight of the Royal Oak.

Parliament of England
Parliament suspended since 1629	Member of Parliament for Lancashire; 1640; With: Sir Gilbert Hoghton, 2nd Baronet	Succeeded by Ralph Ashton; Roger Kirkby
