= William Fanshawe =

English politician

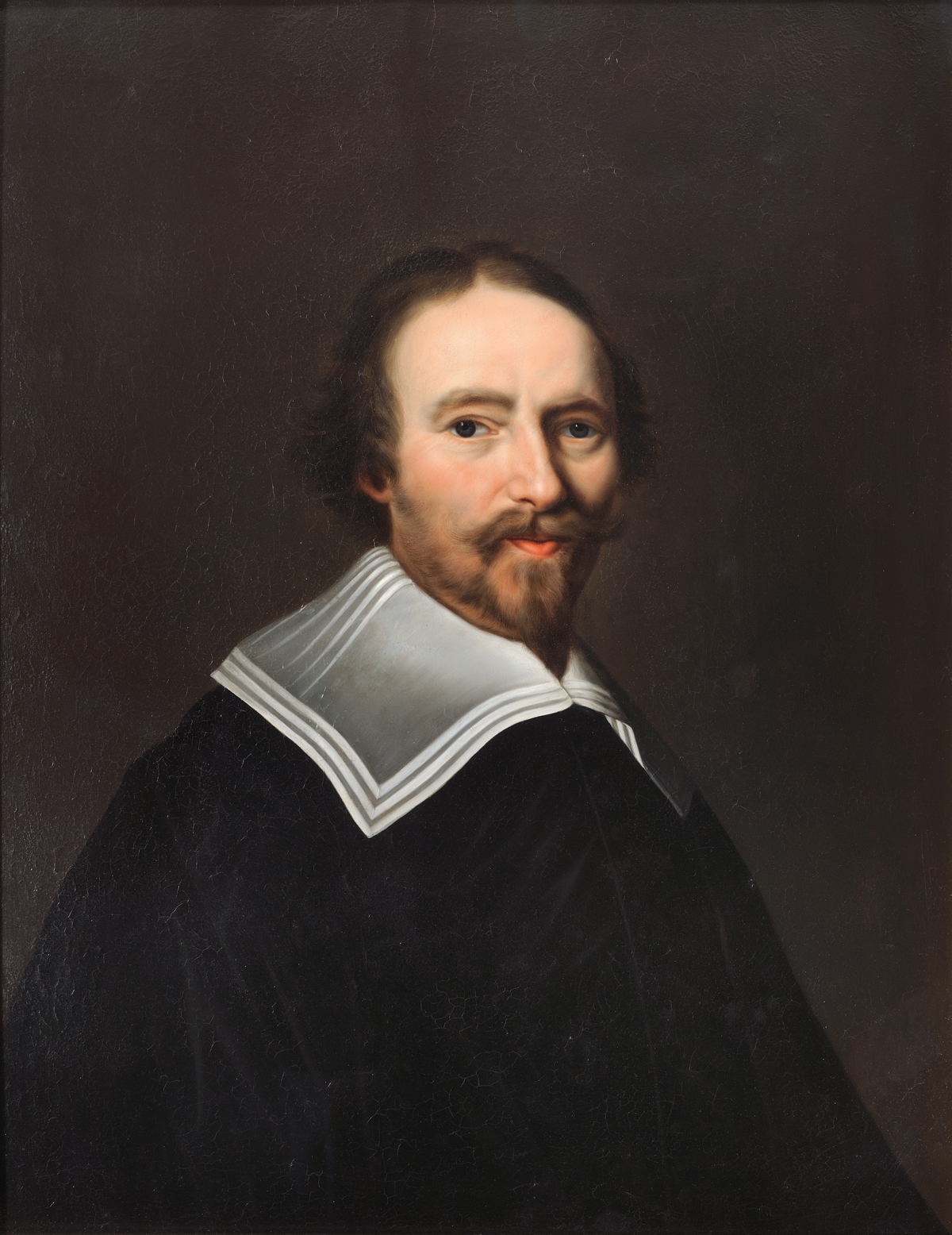
William Fanshawe by Cornelis Janssens van Ceulen

William Fanshawe (1583 – 4 March 1634) was an English politician who sat in the House of Commons between 1614 and 1625.

== Life ==
Fanshawe was the second son of Thomas Fanshawe, of Ware Park, Hertfordshire and his second wife Joan Smyth, the daughter of Thomas "Customer" Smythe, of Ostenhanger.

== Landowner ==
In 1619, Fanshawe purchased Parsloes Manor and 91 acres attached to it in what is now known as Parsloes Park in Dagenham £1150 from Edward Osborne. The manor would remain in the Fanshawe family for the next 300 years.

== Career ==
Fanshawe was Auditor for the Duchy of Lancaster. In 1614 he was elected Member of Parliament for Lancaster and entered the East India Company. In 1619, he acquired the manor of Parsloes, Essex, which was held by his descendants until 1917. He was elected MP for Clitheroe in 1621 and was re-elected MP for Clitheroe in 1624 and 1625.

Fanshawe died at the age of 51. William Fanshawe was the progenitor of the Parsloes Branch of the Fanshawe family. Robert Fanshawe was a descendant of William.

Parliament of England
Preceded by Thomas Fanshawe; Sir Thomas Howard	Member of Parliament for Lancaster; 1614; With: Thomas Fanshawe	Succeeded by Thomas Fanshawe; Sir Humphrey May
Preceded by Sir Gilbert Hoghton, 2nd Baronet; Clement Coke	Member of Parliament for Clitheroe; 1621–1625; With: Sir Thomas Walmsley 1621–1622; Ralph Whitfield 1624; Ralph Assheton 1625	Succeeded by Ralph Assheton; George Kirke
