= John Travers (MP) =

English politician

John Travers (fl. 1307) was an English politician.

He was a member (MP) of the parliament of England for Lancashire in January 1307.
