= Henry de Boteler =

13th-century English politician

Henry de Boteler (fl. 1296), was an English Member of Parliament (MP).

He was a Member of the Parliament of England for Lancashire in 1296.
