= Richard Houghton (died c. 1422) =

Member of the Parliament of England

Richard Hoghton or Houghton (c. 1322 – c. 1422) was an English knight and the Member of Parliament for Lancashire in February 1383 and again in 1402.

He served as High Sheriff of Lancashire for 1399–1400.
