= Thomas Talbot (MP for Lancashire) =

16th-century English politician

Sir Thomas Talbot (born 1507/1508 died 1 August 1558), of Bashall, Yorkshire, Rishton and Lower Darwen, Lancashire, was an English politician.

He was a member (MP) of the parliament of England for Lancashire in 1558.
