= Henry Dade =

English lawyer and member of parliament

Henry Dade (c. 1582 – 1653) was an English lawyer who was active as a judge in the ecclesiastical courts as well as the Suffolk Vice admiralty court. He became a member of parliament for Dunwich in the addled parliament of 1614.

Parliament of England
Preceded by Philip Gawdy; Thomas Smythe	Member of Parliament for Dunwich; 1614; With: Philip Gawdy	Succeeded by Clement Coke; Thomas Bedingfield
