= Richard Molyneux, 1st Viscount Molyneux =

English politician

Richard Molyneux, 1st Viscount Molyneux (1594–1636) was an English politician who sat in the House of Commons at various times between 1614 and 1629.

== Biography ==
Molyneux was the son of Sir Richard Molyneux, 1st Baronet of Sefton and his wife Frances Gerard, the daughter of Sir Gilbert Gerard and Anne Ratcliffe. He matriculated at Brasenose College, Oxford on 24 November 1609, at the age of 15. He was knighted on 27 March 1613. In 1614, he was elected Member of Parliament for Wigan. He held the office of Receiver-General of the Duchy of Lancaster from 1616. He succeeded to the Molyneux baronetcy as the 2nd Baronet on the death of his father on 8 February 1622.

In 1625 and 1628 Molyneux was elected MP for Lancashire. On 22 December 1628 he was created Viscount Molyneux by King Charles I (taking his seat in the Irish House of Lords on 4 November 1634). In the same year, he was appointed Deputy Lieutenant of Lancashire but noted as a recusant and non communicant. According to Gerald Aylmer, Molyneux was one of only two Royalist gentry in the county of Lancashire who held an important office of state during the period 1625–1642 (?) to 1636.

== Family ==
Molyneux married Mary (1596 – before 21 June 1639), daughter of Sir Thomas Caryll of Bentons, Shipley, West Sussex, in about 1618. His widow remarried, to Raphael Tarterau, Carver to the Queen Consort (he survived her).

Molyneux was succeeded by his son Richard Molyneux, 2nd Viscount Molyneux. His daughter Charlotte married Sir William Stanley, Bt, of Hooton and his daughter Mary became the wife of Sir John Gage, Bt, of Firle, Sussex.

Molyneux's brother, Sir Vivian Molyneux, was a scholar, traveller and Royalist agent in the 1640s, and an uncle of Robert Dormer, 1st Earl of Carnarvon, Lord Lieutenant of Buckinghamshire.

== Notes ==
Parliament of England
Preceded by Sir William Cooke; Sir John Pulteney	Member of Parliament for Wigan; 1614; With: Gilbert Gerard	Succeeded by Sir Thomas Gerard; Roger Downes
Preceded by Sir John Ratcliffe; Sir Thomas Walmsley	Member of Parliament for Lancashire; 1625; With: Sir John Ratcliffe	Succeeded by Robert Stanley; Sir Gilbert Hoghton
Preceded by Robert Stanley; Sir Gilbert Hoghton	Member of Parliament for Lancashire; 1628–1629; With: Sir Alexander Radcliffe	Parliament suspended until 1640
Peerage of Ireland
New creation	Viscount Molyneux; 1628–1636	Succeeded by Richard Molyneux
Baronetage of England
Preceded by Richard Molyneux	Baronet (of Sefton); 1622–1636	Succeeded by Richard Molyneux
