= Thomas Gerard (MP for Lancashire) =

English politician

Sir Thomas Gerard (died 1416), of Ashton-in-Makerfield, Lancashire and Kingsley, Cheshire, was an English politician.

He was a member (MP) of the parliament of England for Lancashire in April 1384, February 1388 and 1394.
