= Gilbert de Singleton =

English politician

Gilbert de Singleton (fl. 1300–1307) was an English politician.

He was a member (MP) of the parliament of England for Lancashire in 1300, 1302 and 1307.
