= Henry de Keighley =

13th-century English politician

Henry de Keighley (fl. 1297–1301) was an English Member of Parliament (MP).

He was a Member of the Parliament of England for Lancashire in 1297, 1298 and 1301.
