= John de Evyas =

13th-century English politician

John de Evyas (fl. 1295), was an English Member of Parliament (MP).

He was a Member of the Parliament of England for Lancashire in 1295.
