= John Denyas =

13th-century English politician

John Denyas (fl. 1298), was an English Member of Parliament (MP).

He was a Member of the Parliament of England for Lancashire in 1298.
