= John Croft (MP) =

14th-century English politician

Sir John Croft of Dalton, Lancashire, was an English politician.

He was a member (MP) of the parliament of England for Lancashire in September 1388 and November 1390.
