= John de Holcroft =

English politician

John de Holcroft (fl. 1373–1383) was an English politician.

He was a member (MP) of the parliament of England for Lancashire in 1373 and October 1383.
