= John Kitchen (English politician) =

16th-century politician

John Kitchen (by 1507 – 1562), of Hatfield, Hertfordshire and Pilling, Lancashire, was an English politician.

He was a member (MP) of the parliament of England for Lancashire in 1545 and 1547.
