= John Ratcliffe (Lancashire MP) =

English politician

John Ratcliffe (c. 1536–1590) of Ordsall, Lancashire, England, was an English politician.

He was a Member (MP) of the Parliament of England for Wigan in 1563 and for Lancashire in 1571 and 1572.

== Marriage and family ==
Ratcliffe married Anne, daughter of Thomas Asshawe of Hall-on-the-Hill, Chorley. Their children included:

- Alexander Ratcliffe (1574–1599)
- Margaret Radclyffe (1575–1599).
- John Ratcliffe (soldier), who married Alice Byron
- Jane Ratcliffe, who married Ralph Constable
