= William de Clifton =

English politician

William de Clifton (fl. 1302–1305) was an English politician.

He was a member (MP) of the parliament of England for Lancashire in 1302 and 1305.
