= Richard Houghton (died 1559) =

English politician

Sir Richard Houghton (28 April 1496 or 1498 – 5 August 1559), of Lea and Hoghton, Lancashire, was an English landowner, local official and Member of Parliament.

== Family ==
Houghton was the eldest son of William Houghton of Lea and Hoghton and his wife, Margaret née Southworth, a daughter of Sir John Southworth of Samlesbury. C.1514, Houghton married Alice Ashton, a daughter of Sir Thomas Ashton of Ashton-under-Lyne, with whom he had two sons and two daughters. His second wife was Alice née Morley, with whom he had two sons and three daughters. His third wife was Elizabeth Grigson, a daughter of John Grigson. His fourth and final wife was Anne née Browne, a daughter of Roger Browne of Witney, by whom he had five sons and three daughters.

== Career ==
He was named a Member (MP) of the Parliament of England for Lancashire in March 1553. There is a suggestion that he may have been too ill to take part in that Parliament.
