= Marks Gate =

Coordinates: 51.593°N 0.1448°E

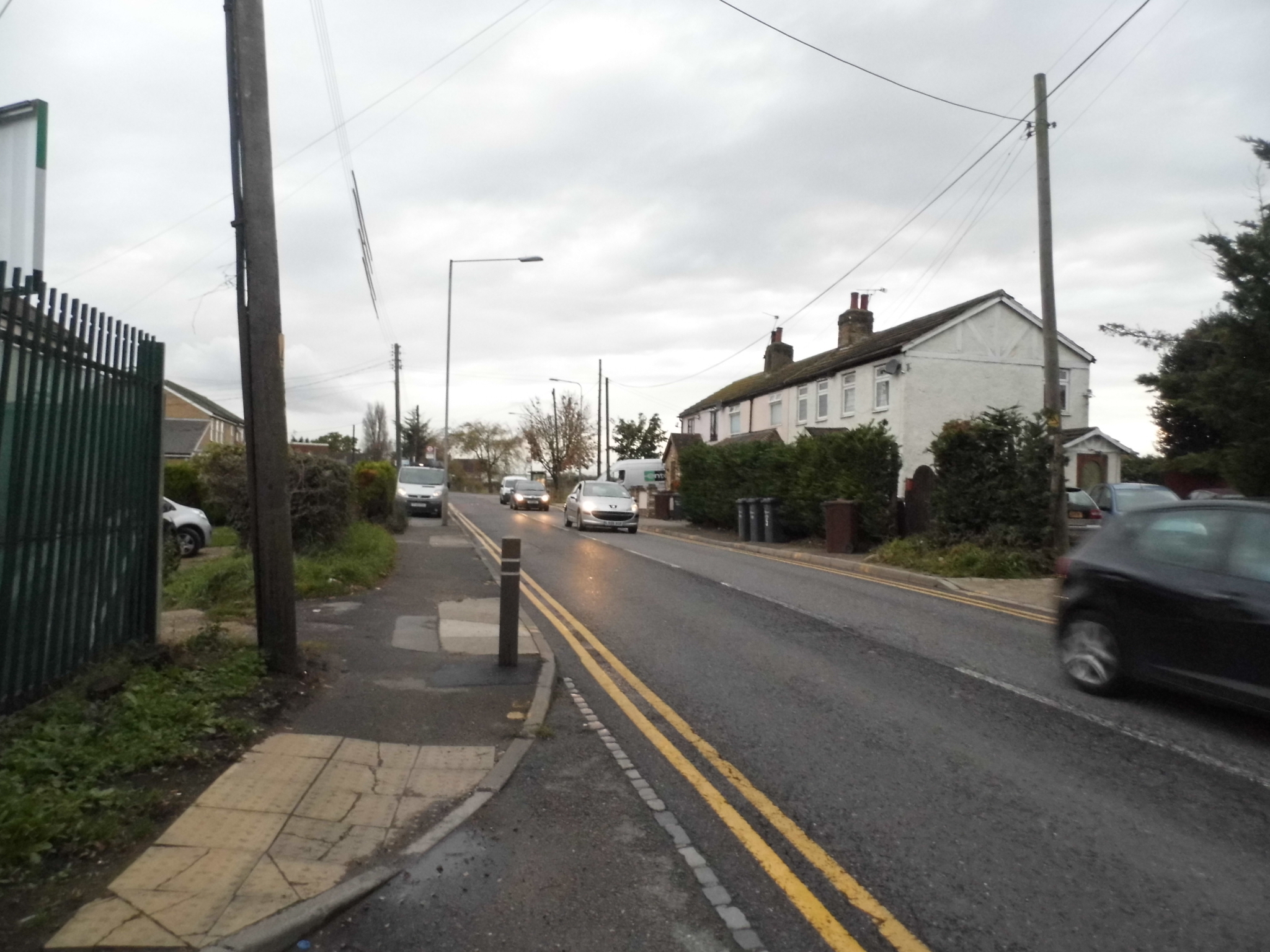
- Collier Row Road, Marks Gate

- Location within Greater London
- OS grid reference: TQ485905
- London borough: Barking & Dagenham
- Ceremonial county: Greater London
- Region: London
- Country: England
- Sovereign state: United Kingdom
- Post town: ROMFORD
- Postcode district: RM6
- Dialling code: 020
- Police: Metropolitan
- Fire: London
- Ambulance: London
- UK Parliament: Dagenham
- London Assembly: City and East

Marks Gate is an area of London, England in the London Borough of Barking and Dagenham. Part of East London, it is immediately north of Chadwell Heath and to the west of Romford.

The name originally referred to an entrance or gate into Hainault Forest at the northern end of the current Whalebone Lane North, the name being derived from the proximity of the gate to the manor of Marks (later Marks Hall) which stood on what is now Warren Hall Farm. As with many old houses the name was derived from the de Merk family who built the original manor in the 14th Century.

The oldest evidence for a settlement in this location is of a fortified village on the hilltop around 600 BC, and by 1777 Marks Gate was shown on maps as a hamlet on the southern edge of Hainault Forest. Subsequent development in the 1950s has overtaken two other gates to the forest, at Roselane Gate at the northern end of Rose Lane, and a further gate at Padnall Corner.

Scenes for the 2009 film Harry Brown were filmed on the Marks Gate Estate. Famous ex-residents include David Essex who lived in Padnall Road.

== Transport ==
Marks Gate is served by a small portion of the London Buses network. Route 62 links to Barking, 296 links to Romford and Ilford, and Route 362 serves to Goodmayes and Grange Hill via Hainault Forest at a lower frequency.

The nearest stations to Marks Gate are located at Newbury Park and Chadwell Heath respectively, each served by the London Underground and Elizabeth line services towards Central London, West London and Essex.
