= Roger Pilkington (MP) =

Member of the Parliament of England

Roger Pilkington (c. 1325–1407) was an English soldier and politician. He served under Henry, Duke of Lancaster, and later under John of Gaunt in Aquitaine.

His daughter Margaret married Sir John Arderne of Aldford Hall.

He was a member (MP) of the parliament of England for Lancashire in 1363 and subsequently.
