= Roger Kirkby (Royalist) =

English politician

Roger Kirkby (died August 1643) was an English politician who sat in the House of Commons from 1640 to 1642. He supported the Royalist cause in the English Civil War.

Kirkby was the son of Roger Kirkby of Kirkby Ireleth in Lonsdale. He succeeded to his estate on the death of his father in 1627.

In April 1640, Kirkby was elected Member of Parliament for Lancaster in the Short Parliament He was elected MP for Lancashire for the Long Parliament in November 1640. He supported the King's party and was disabled from sitting on 29 August 1642.

Kirkby died in August 1643.

Kirkby married Agnes Lowther, sister of Sir John Lowther, 1st Baronet and had a son Richard who was also an MP.

Parliament of England
Vacant Parliament suspended since 1629	Member of Parliament for Lancaster; 1640; With: John Harrison	Succeeded by Thomas Fanshawe; John Harrison
Preceded by Sir Gilbert Hoghton, 2nd Baronet; William Farrington	Member of Parliament for Lancashire; 1640–1642; With: Ralph Assheton	Succeeded by Sir Richard Hoghton, 3rd Baronet; Ralph Assheton
