= Ralph Ipres =

English politician

Ralph Ipres (c. 1336 – 1397), of Quernmore, Lancashire, was an English politician.

He was a member (MP) of the parliament of England for Lancashire in 1378, January 1390 and 1393.
