= John Rigmayden =

16th-century English politician

John Rigmayden (1515/16–1557), of Wedacre in Garstang, Lancashire, was an English politician.

He was a member (MP) of the parliament of England for Lancashire in October 1553.
