= Richard Fleetwood =

English politician

Member of Parliament for Lancashire
- In office 18 April 1704 – 1705

Personal details
- Born: 1653
- Died: 1709 (aged 55–56)
- Occupation: Politician

Richard Fleetwood (1653–1709), of Rossall Hall, Lancashire, was an English politician.

He was a member (MP) of the parliament of England for Lancashire from 18 April 1704 to 1705.
