= Robert Stanley (MP) =

English politician

Sir Robert Stanley KB (died 3 June 1632) was an English politician who sat in the House of Commons in 1626.

Stanley was the son of William Stanley, 6th Earl of Derby. Through his paternal grandmother, he was a great-great-grandson of Mary Tudor, Queen of France and Charles Brandon, 1st Duke of Suffolk, thereby making him a direct descendant of Henry VII. He was appointed Knight of the Order of the Bath at the coronation of King Charles I on 2 February 1626. In 1626, he was elected Member of Parliament for Lancashire. He was of Ormskirk, Lancashire and Chelsea, Middlesex.

Parliament of England
Preceded by Sir Richard Molyneux, Bt; Sir John Ratcliffe	Member of Parliament for Lancashire; 1626; With: Sir Gilbert Hoghton	Succeeded by Sir Richard Molyneux; Sir Alexander Radcliffe
