= Robert Urswyk =

English politician

Robert Urswyk (c. 1336 – September 1402) was an English politician. He sat as MP for Lancashire in 1379, 1381, October 1382, November 1384, 1385, November 1390, 1391, 1393, 1394, 1395, January 1397, 1399 and 1401.

He was knighted by 28 October 1386.

== Offices held ==
He served as master forester of Amounderness, Quernmore and Wyresdale and forester of Myerscough Lancashire for John of Gaunt from 5 September 1374 till circa. February 1399 and then forester for Henry IV from circa. October 1399 till his death in 1402 and chief steward of Lanes for Gaunt from 1392 till 1393.

He also served as commissioner of oyer and terminer in Lancashire in February 1382, March 1383 and 1384 concerning trespasses in Gaunt's forests), commissioner of array in February 1384 and March 1400, commissioner to recruit archers to fight with Gaunt in Spain in March 1386, commissioner of inquiry in Yorkshire, Cumberland, Westmorland, and Lanes in May 1388 concerning wastes at St. Leonard's Hospital, York and in Lancashire in July 1391 concerning trespassing, commissioner to make arrests in August 1396 and commissioner to prevent the spread of treasonous rumours in May 1402.

He also served as escheator of Lancashire from 8 April 1383 till before 6 October 1388, and by March 1389 till 1 December 1391, justice of the peace in Lancashire on 18 March 1384, 15 August 1393 till July 1394 and 16 March 1400 till his death. He also served as collector of pontage for the repair of Preston bridge in Lanes from 12 March 1400 till his death.

== Family ==
He was the son and heir of Adam Urswyk (died 1361) and Sarah, the daughter and heiress of Robert Tatham. By 1367, he married Margaret, the daughter and heiress of Thomas Southworth and widow of Robert Hornby and had one son. By 1372, he married Ellen (fl. 1394), the widow of Sir John Dalton (died 1369) and they had at least one son (including Thomas Urswyk who sat as MP) and two daughters. By July 1398, he married Joan.

His daughter, Ellen, married Richard Molyneux, who was also an MP for Lancashire.
