= Richard de Towneley (MP) =

Member of the Parliament of England

Richard de Towneley, also known as Richard de la Legh, (c. 1313 – 16 April 1381) was an English landowner and politician. He was an early member of the Towneley family of Towneley Hall in Burnley.

== Family ==
The land at Towneley was enclosed by the Deans of Whalley around 1200 as a hunting park. Previously, it had been common pasture land used by the people of Burnley. The land passed through the family to successive Deans of Whalley until the last male descendants died, some time before 1295. One of these descendants was named Richard. (Not Richard, the subject of this article.) His widow, Cecilia de Thonlay, then became heiress to the Towneley estates. One of her three daughters (also named Cecilia) married John de la Legh, son of Gilbert de la Legh. Around 1304, the elder Cecilia gave John de la Legh the land she held at Towneley. John’s second son Richard took de Towneley as his surname, apparently as part of his inheritance of the estate. Another source states that John de la Legh was Richard's grandfather, rather than his father.

Richard de Towneley married a woman named Helen or Ellen, who was living in 1345. He appears to have had three sons and one daughter. The eldest son, John, was born in about 1350 (as he was 31 at the time of Richard's death). In 1351, Richard rented the manor of St. Saviour, at Stydd, near Ribchester, and it is likely that he no longer lived at Towneley after this date. Richard de Towneley died on 16 April 1381.

John was married to Isabel Rixton, daughter of neighboring landowner William Rixton. John and Isabel had a son, Richard, who inherited Towneley hall upon John's death in 1410, and a daughter, Matilda, who married William Fleming. Whitaker's original statement, picked up by Burke, that John married a second wife called Elizabeth Nagier was a mistake based on a misunderstanding of the French nagueres, meaning 'formerly' as Langton pointed out. Isabella and Elizabeth[a] were alternate versions of the same name. The Inquisition post mortem of 1401 refers to Isabella nee Rixton.

== Politics ==
Richard de Towneley was twice selected as a Member of Parliament for Lancashire. His first appointment was to the 36th parliament of Edward III's reign, which was summoned on 20 November 1360 and assembled from 24 January to 18 February 1361. Among the acts of this parliament was to define the selection and responsibilities of justices of the peace. This act remained in effect until repealed by the Statute Law Revision Act 1948 and Criminal Law Act 1967.

Richard was also selected to represent the county at Edward III's 43rd parliament, which was summoned on 8 January 1371 and assembled from 24 February to 29 March 1371. Among its accomplishments was to assert parliament's right to approve indirect taxation.

In 1366 he was recorded as a witness to a property transfer in his role as the seneschal of the wapentake of Cliderow (Clitheroe). Richard was appointed by John of Gaunt to three terms as the High Sheriff of Lancashire, in 1375, 1376 and 1377.

== Sources ==
- Barker, Susan (1 May 2013). "High Royd Pitch and Putt – Watch Out for the Wolf".
- Burke, John (1835), "Towneley, of Towneley", A Genealogical and Heraldic History of the Commoners of Great Britain and Ireland, Enjoying Territorial Possessions or High Official Rank; but Uninvested with Heritable Honours, vol. 2, pp. 262–266
- "Justices of the Peace Act 1361 (1361 Chapter 1 34 Edw 3)". The National Archives. 1361.
- Kitto, Tony (2007). "The Story of Towneley Park in Maps 1661–2007 (A Brief History of Towneley Park from Maps)" (PDF).
- Langton, William (1875), Abstracts of Inquisitions Post Mortem, Made by Christopher Towneley and Roger Dodsworth: Extracted from Manuscripts at Towneley (in Latin), Chetham Society, OCLC 5162225
- Pink, William Duncombe; Beaven, Alfred Beaven (1889), The Parliamentary Representation of Lancashire, (County and Borough), 1258–1885, with Biographical and Genealogical Notices of the Members, Etc.
- Smith, Thomas Charles; Shortt, Jonathan (1890), The History of the Parish of Ribchester, in the County of Lancaster, Ribchester: Bemrose & Sons
