= Andrew Barton (16th-century MP) =

16th-century English politician

Andrew Barton (1497/98–1549), of Smithills Hall in Deane, Bolton, Lancashire and Holme, Nottinghamshire, was an English politician.

He was a member (MP) of the parliament of England for Lancashire in 1529.
