= Mathew de Redman =

English politician

Mathew de Redman (fl. 1294–1307) was an English Member of Parliament (MP).

He was a Member of the Parliament of England for Lancashire in 1294 and 1307.
