= William de Bradshaigh =

English politician

William de Bradshaigh (fl. 1313–1331) was an English politician.

He was a member (MP) of the parliament of England for Lancashire in 1313, January 1316, 1325, 1328, 1330 and 1331.
