= William le Gentil =

English politician

William le Gentil (fl. 1307–1311) was an English politician.

He was a member (MP) of the parliament of England for Lancashire in 1307 and 1311.
