= Sir Gilbert Hoghton, 2nd Baronet =

English politician

Sir Gilbert Hoghton, 2nd Baronet (1591 – April 1648) was an English politician who sat in the House of Commons variously between 1614 and 1640. He was a Royalist leader during the English Civil War.

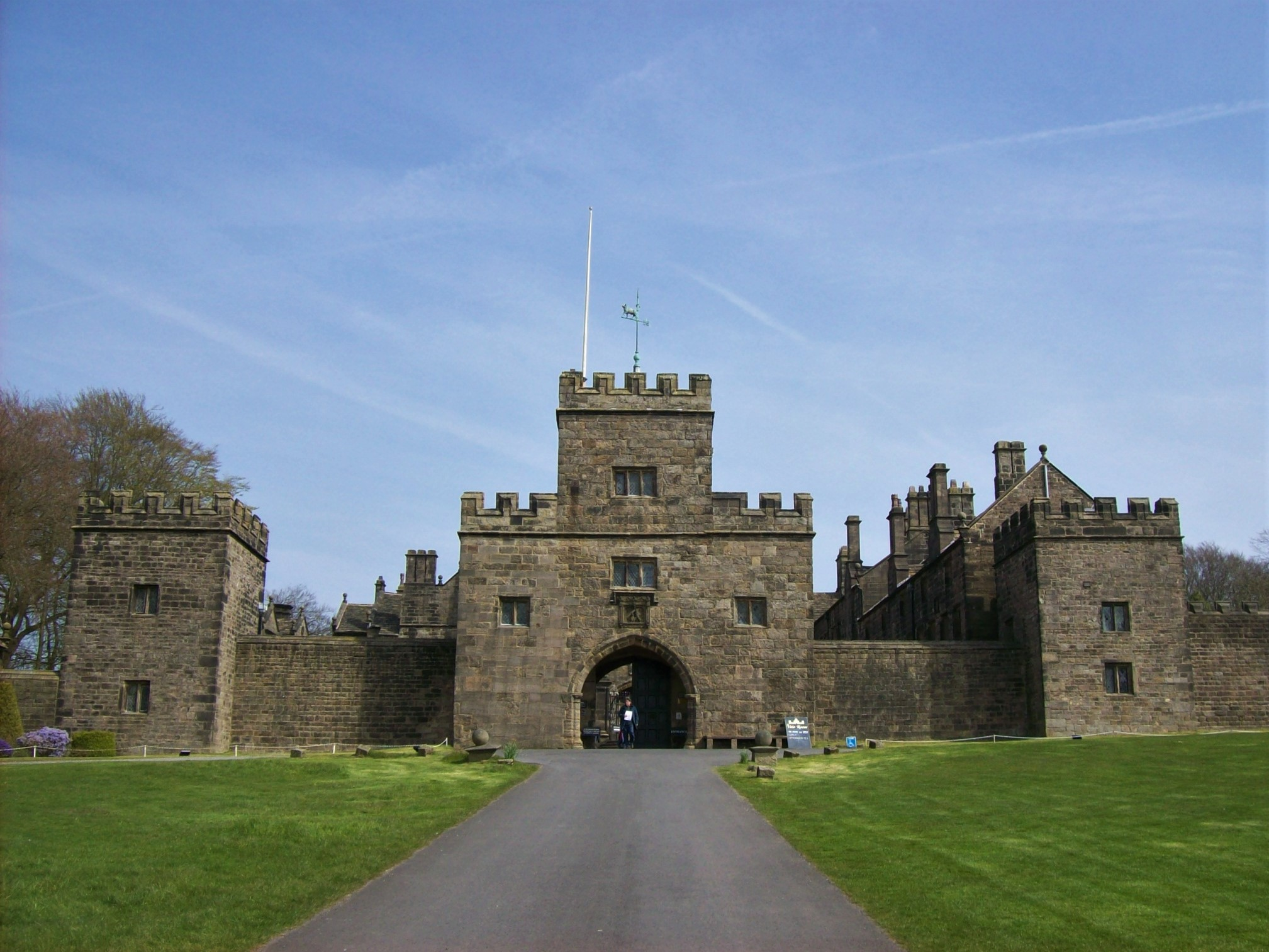
Hoghton Tower

== Biography ==
Hoghton was the son of Sir Richard Hoghton, 1st Baronet of Hoghton Tower, Lancashire. He became a courtier, and a favourite of King James I and was knighted by the king at Whitehall on 21 July 1604.

In 1614, Hoghton was elected Member of Parliament for Clitheroe to the Addled Parliament. and was then elected in 1621 to hold the county seat for Lancashire until 1622. He was re-elected MP for Lancashire in 1626. In 1630 he inherited the baronetcy on the death of his father.

Gilbert Hoghton was one of the dancers in Ben Jonson's The Vision of Delight in January 1617. The rehearsals were held at Newmarket Palace and the masque was performed at Whitehall Palace. Lady Anne Clifford and Pocohontas were in the audience.

In April 1640, Hoghton was re-elected MP for Lancashire to the Short Parliament. He was High Sheriff of Lancashire in 1643. In the Civil War he was a prominent Lancastrian Royalist commander and the first to take action in the Blackburn Hundred. In February 1643 he was present at the loss of Preston and later served at Chester. Hoghton Tower was used a Royalist garrison and part of the tower was accidentally blown up by parliamentary forces, killing a number of them. The estate was subsequently sequestered.

Hoghton died in April 1648 and was buried at Preston.

== Family ==
Hoghton had married Margaret (died 22 December 1657), the eldest daughter of four daughters and co-heiress of Sir Roger Aston of Cranford, Middlesex, (Note: Hoghton's father-in-law, Sir Roger Aston, was a Gentleman of the Bedchamber and Master of the Great Wardrobe to King James I (Betham 1801, p. 37).) with whom he had six sons and four daughters:

1. George, the eldest son, died young.
2. Richard, succeeded to the title and estate.
3. Roger (died 1643), who was killed in the Battle of Marston Moor
4. Gilbert (died 1661), became a major in the regiment of Sir Gilbert Gerard, married Lettice, daughter and co-heir of Sir Francis Gamull of Chester
5. Thomas, died young;
6. Henry, captain of horse under James, Earl of Derby; married Mary, daughter of Peter Egerton of Shaw, in Lancashire, and widow of Sir Thomas Stanley of Bickerstaffe, in Lancashire.

Of the daughters:

1. Catharine, married Thomas Preston of Holker, in Lancashire.
2. Mary, married Sir Hugh Calverly of Lea, Cheshire.
3. Margaret, married Alexander Rigby of Middleton, in Lancashire.
4. Anne died young.

He was succeeded by his son Sir Richard, who was able to recover the Hoghton estate.

== Notes ==
Parliament of England
Preceded by Sir John Dormer; Martin Lister	Member of Parliament for Clitheroe; 1614; With: Clement Coke	Succeeded by Sir Thomas Walmsley; William Fanshawe
Preceded by Sir Thomas Gerard, Bt; Sir Cuthbert Halsall	Member of Parliament for Lancashire; 1621–1622; With: Sir John Ratcliffe	Succeeded by Sir John Ratcliffe; Thomas Walmsley
Preceded by Sir John Ratcliffe; Sir Richard Molyneux	Member of Parliament for Lancashire; 1626; With: Robert Stanley	Succeeded by Sir Richard Molyneux; Sir Alexander Radcliffe
Parliament suspended since 1629	Member of Parliament for Lancashire; 1640; With: William Farrington	Succeeded by Ralph Ashton; Roger Kirkby
Baronetage of England
Preceded by Richard Hoghton	Baronet (of Hoghton Tower); 1630–1647	Succeeded by Richard Hoghton
