= Richard Nowell (MP) =

14th-century English politician

Richard Nowell (fl. 1354) was an English politician.

He was a member (MP) of the parliament of England for Lancashire in 1354.
