= Henry de Trafford =

English politician

Henry de Trafford (fl. 1312) was an English politician.

He was a member (MP) of the parliament of England for Lancashire in 1312.
