= Thomas Urswick =

English lawyer (c.1415–1479)

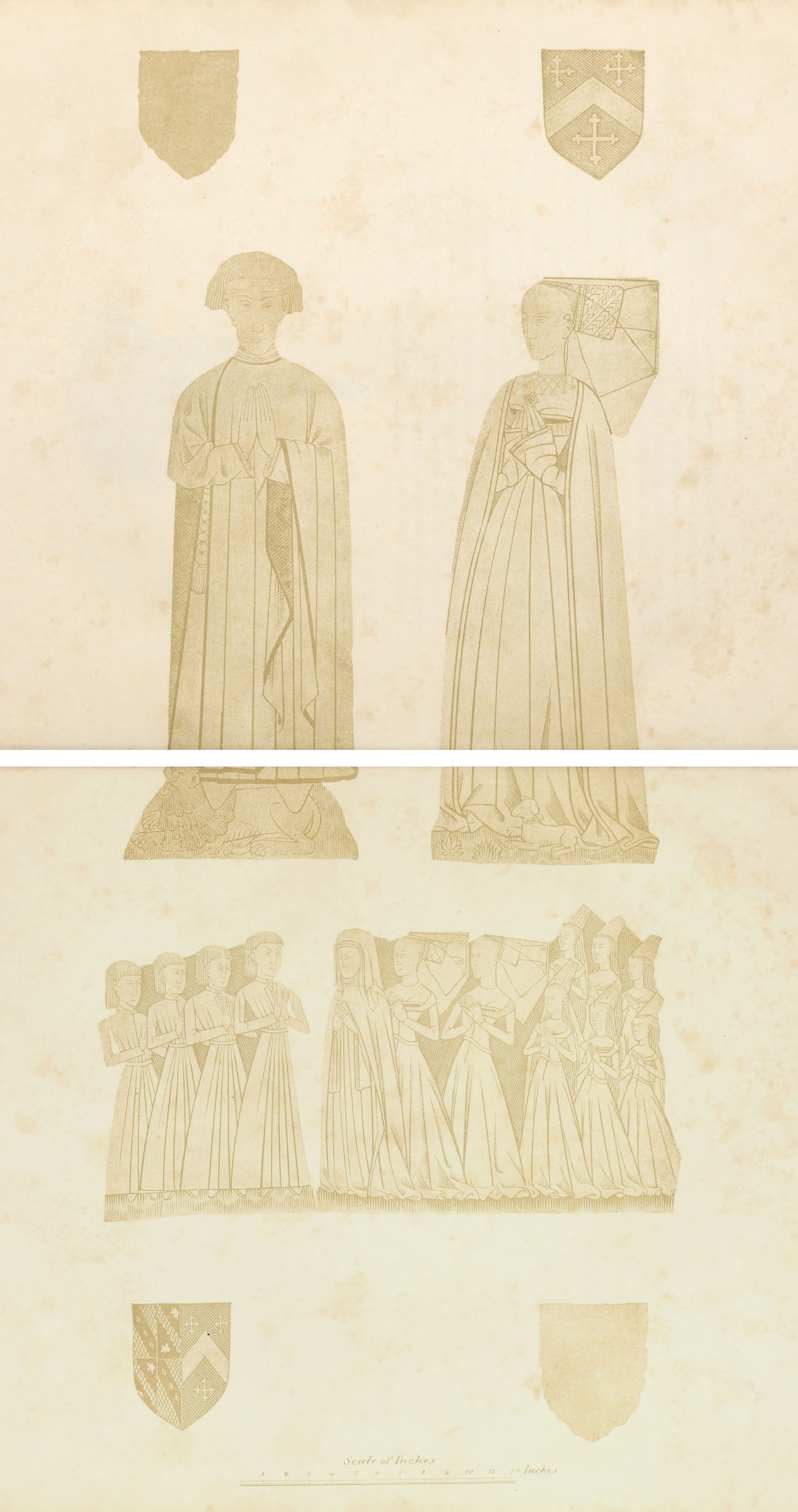
Thomas Urswyk and his family. Memorial brass from the church of Saints Peter and Paul, Dagenham

Sir Thomas Urswick (c.1415–1479), also referred to as Urswyk or Urswyck, was an English lawyer who became Recorder of London and Chief Baron of the Exchequer. He was one of the leading citizens of London who admitted Edward IV into the city in 1471, which led to the imprisonment and death of Henry VI.

== Biography ==
Little is known of Urswick's private life. He was probably from a north country family, born about 1415, the son of Sir Thomas Urswick of Badsworth, and his wife Joan. He studied law at Gray's Inn. He was elected to the office of Common Serjeant of the City of London in 1453, and then elected Recorder the following year. In 1461 he became one of the four London Members of Parliament.

In April 1471, during the Wars of the Roses, Henry VI was in London, staying in the palace of the Bishop of London. The population in general supported the King, and turned out armed to support him. A group of leading citizens with Yorkist sympathies, including Urswick, advised the crowd to go home, and allowed Edward IV to enter the city. Edward was able to seize and imprison Henry, who died not long after in the tower. Urswick then played a prominent part in the defeat of the attack by Thomas Fauconberg on London in May, and was knighted in June 1471.

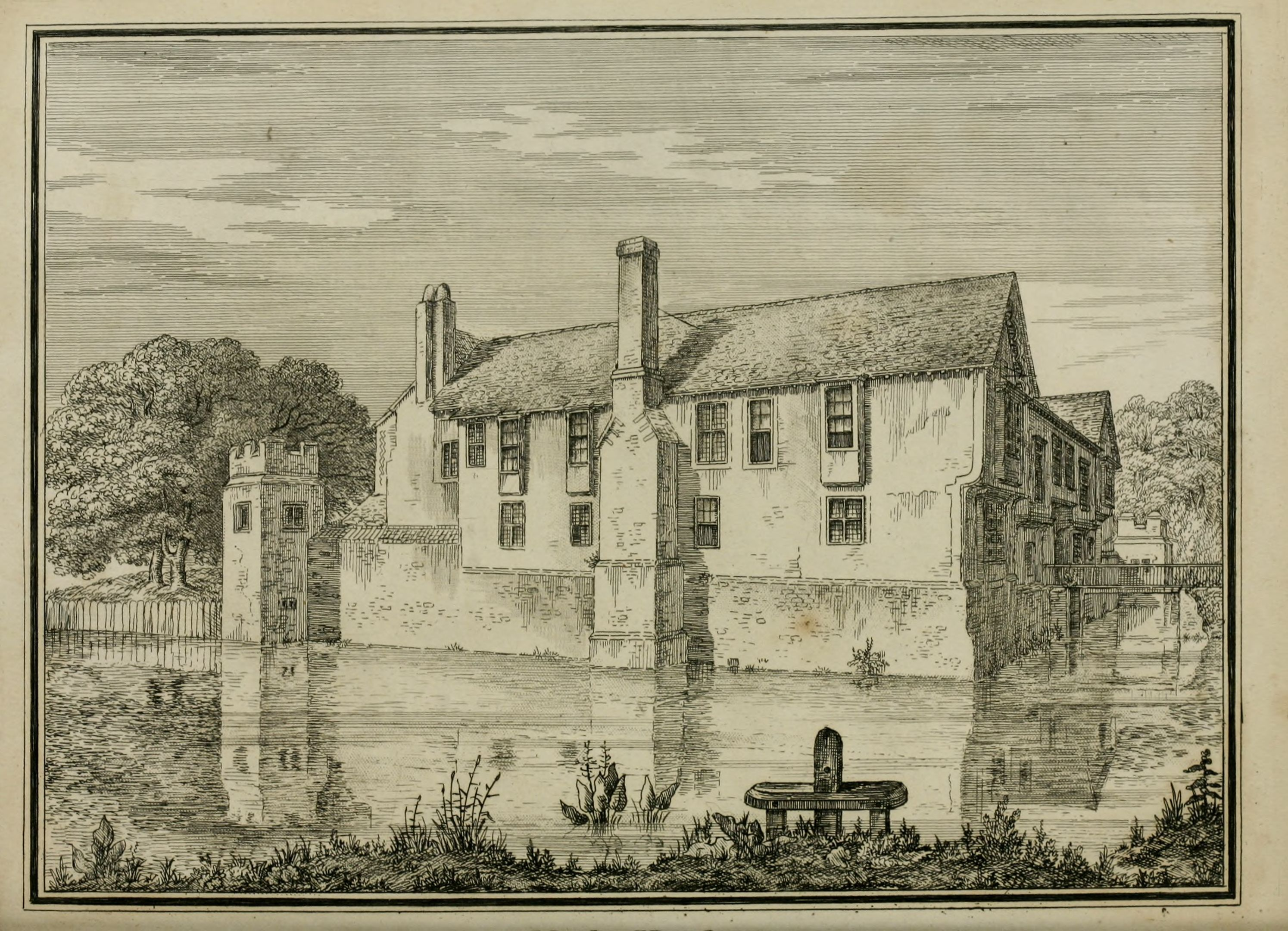
Marks Manor House, near Romford, Urswick's country home

In May 1471, Urswick was appointed Chief Baron of the Exchequer, a position he held until his death. He received a fee of 110 marks yearly, and also two robes yearly, one with skin at Christmas, and one with lining at Whitsuntide. His main country residence was at Marks Manor, near Romford, a moated house "of considerable antiquity" (since demolished). The memorial brass in Dagenham parish church shows that he had four sons and nine daughters, though when he died in 1479 only five daughters survived as heirs.
