= John de Ashton (seneschal) =

Ashton arms: Argent, a mullet sable pierced of the field

Sir John de Ashton or Sir John Assheton (died 1428), was an MP and soldier under King Henry IV and King Henry V.

Ashton was the son of Sir John de Ashton and his wife, Joan Radcliffe. He was one of forty-six esquires who were summoned to attend the grand coronation of Henry IV in 1399, in honour of which event they were solemnly admitted to the Order of the Bath.

== Career ==
Ashton served in 1411, 1413 and 1416 as a knight of the shire (MP) for Lancashire.

In 1416 he was with Thomas of Lancaster, 1st Duke of Clarence at the taking of Bayeux, and was entrusted by the king with the office of seneschal of the city. There is in the 'Fœdera' a document sent to him by Henry IV from Falaise, commanding him to give special protection to the inhabitants of the religious houses. He was also captain of Coutances and Carentan and bailiff of Cotentin.

== Death and legacy ==
Sir John died in 1428. He was twice married (firstly to Isabel, heiress of Sir Richard Kirkby) and left many children, of whom the most distinguished were Sir Thomas de Ashton, the alchemist, and Sir Roger de Ashton, of Middleton.
