= Thomas Bedingfield (judge) =

English judge and politician

Sir Thomas Bedingfield (c. 1592 – 23 March 1661) was an English judge and politician who sat in the House of Commons.

== Biography ==
Bedingfield was born at Redlingfield, Suffolk, the son of Thomas Bedingfield of Darsham, Suffolk and his wife Dorothy Southwell, daughter of John Southwell of Barham. He was at school at Southwold and admitted at Caius College, Cambridge on 24 June 1608, at the age of 16. He was admitted at Gray's Inn on 1 November 1608 and was called to the bar in 1615.

In 1621, Bedingfield was elected Member of Parliament for Dunwich. He was elected MP for Dunwich again in 1626. In 1636 he was Lent Reader for his Inn. He became Attorney-General of the Duchy of Lancaster in 1638 and was knighted in the same year. In 1648, he became serjeant-at-law and Justice of the Common Pleas. He resigned his judgeship after the execution of Charles I in 1649 and represented Suffolk in the First Protectorate Parliament.

Bedingfield died at the age of about 68 and was buried at Darsham. His granddaughter Elizabeth married William de Grey and was the mother of Thomas de Grey.

Parliament of England
Preceded by Philip Gawdy; Henry Dade	Member of Parliament for Dunwich; 1621–1624; With: Clement Coke	Succeeded by Sir John Rous; Sir Robert Brooke
Preceded by Sir John Rous; Sir Robert Brooke	Member of Parliament for Dunwich; 1626–1628; With: Sir John Rous	Succeeded by Sir Robert Brooke; Francis Winterton
