= Thomas Butler (16th-century MP) =

English politician

Sir Thomas Butler or Boteler (1513/14 – 22 September 1579), of Bewsey and Warrington, Lancashire, was an English politician.

He was a Member (MP) of the Parliament of England for Lancashire in March 1553 and 1571. He would be knighted in 1576.
