= Clement Coke =

English politician (??–1629)

Clement Coke (died 24 May 1629) was an English politician who sat in the House of Commons at various times between 1614 and 1629.

Coke was the son of Sir Edward Coke, Chief Justice, and his wife Bridget Paston, daughter of John Paston of Norwich. In 1614, Coke was elected Member of Parliament for Clitheroe. He was elected MP for Dunwich in 1621. Cooke reportedly assaulted the new MP for Hertfordshire, Sir Charles Morrison, on the Parliament stairs. After an enquiry, Cooke was imprisoned in the Tower of London for the attack.

In 1626 he was elected MP for Aylesbury and sat until March 1629 when King Charles decided to rule without parliament, and then did so for eleven years. Coke died two months after the dissolution of the last parliament.

Coke married Sarah Reddish, daughter of Alexander Reddish of Reddish, Lancashire. She brought to him Longford Hall, Derbyshire. His son Edward was created a baronet in 1641.

Parliament of England
Preceded by Sir John Dormer; Martin Lister	Member of Parliament for Clitheroe; 1614–1621; With: Gilbert Hoghton	Succeeded by Sir Thomas Walmsley; William Fanshawe
Preceded by Philip Gawdy; Henry Dade	Member of Parliament for Dunwich; 1621–1624; With: Thomas Bedingfield	Succeeded by Sir John Rous; Sir Robert Brooke
Preceded by Sir Robert Carr; Sir John Hare	Member of Parliament for Aylesbury; 1626–1629; With: Arthur Goodwin 1626–1628; Sir Edmund Verney 1628–1629	Parliament suspended until 1640
