= Thomas Travers (MP) =

English politician

Thomas Travers (fl. 1301) was an English politician.

He was a member (MP) of the parliament of England for Lancashire in 1301.
