= Thomas Radcliffe (MP died 1440) =

Sir Thomas Radcliffe (c. 1391–1440), of Astley and Winmarleigh, Lancashire, was an English member of parliament (MP).

He was a Member of the Parliament of England for Lancashire in May 1421, 1423 and 1433.
