= Thomas Stanley (Lancashire MP, died 1576) =

English politician

Sir Thomas Stanley (1532/33–1576), of Winwick, Lancashire and Tong, Shropshire, was an English politician.

He was a member (MP) of the parliament of England for Lancashire in April 1554, November 1554 and 1555.

His tomb is in St Bartholomew's Church at Tong.
