= Lancashire (constituency) =

Parliamentary constituency in the United Kingdom, 1801–1832

- Former county constituency for the House of Commons
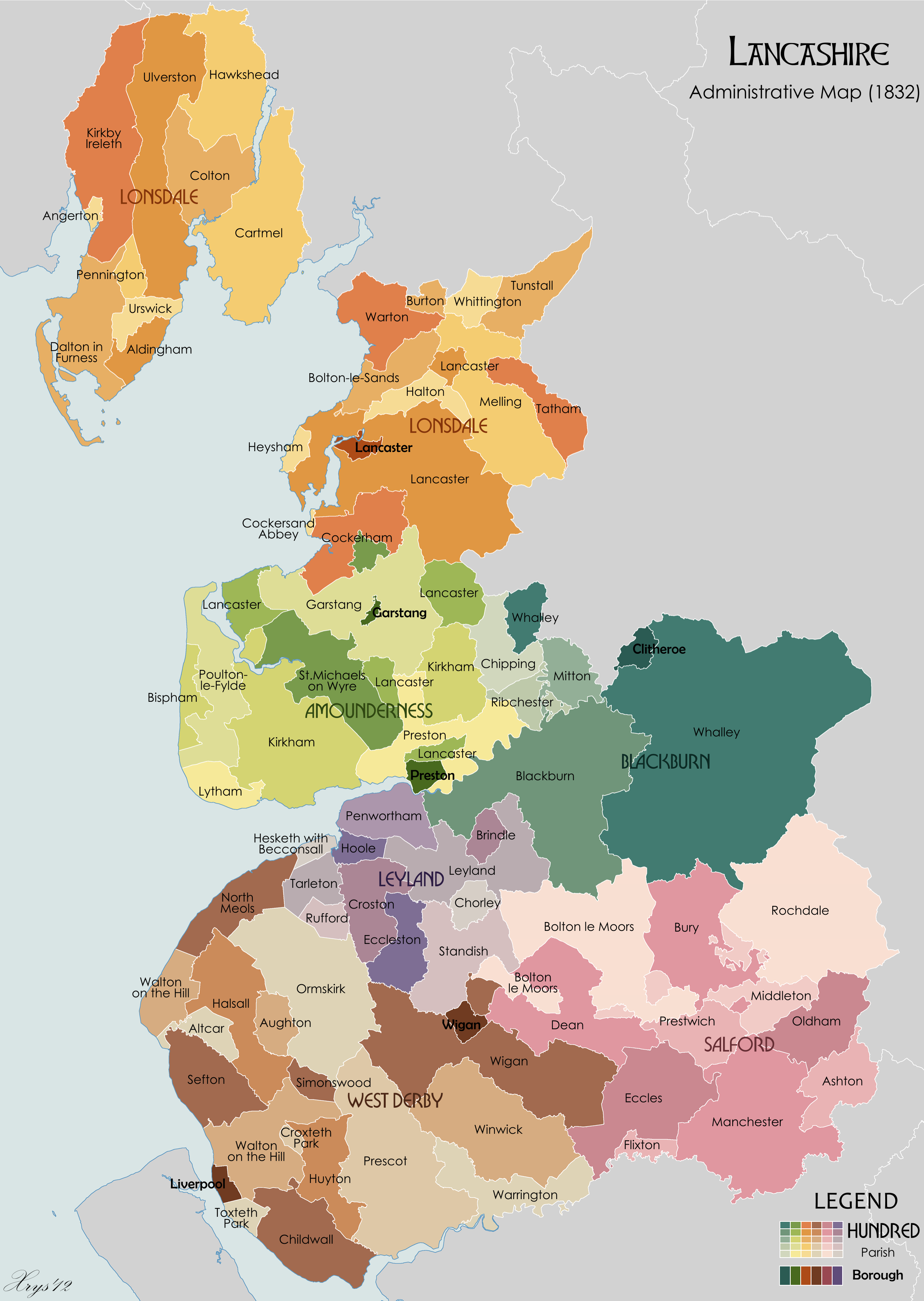
- Map of the traditional (historic) county of Lancashire, showing parishes and hundreds.

1290–1832
- Seats: two
- Replaced by: North Lancashire and South Lancashire; Ashton-under-Lyne, Blackburn, Bolton, Bury, Manchester, Oldham, Rochdale, Salford, and Warrington.

Lancashire was a county constituency of the House of Commons of the Parliament of England from 1290, then of the Parliament of Great Britain from 1707 to 1800, and of the Parliament of the United Kingdom from 1801 to 1832. It was represented by two Members of Parliament, traditionally known as Knights of the Shire until 1832.

The ancient county of Lancashire covers a much larger area than the area now administered by Lancashire County Council. The county town of Lancaster is in the north of the county. The county boundary is further north beyond Carnforth and follows approximately the same boundary as the modern County Council area. The historic county of Lancashire also includes land on the opposite side of Morecambe Bay. Barrow and Furness and the area between Lake Windermere and the River Duddon, and the area west of the River Winster are considered parts of the historic county of Lancashire. Most of the modern district of Ribble Valley is within the boundaries of the historic county of Yorkshire. In the south, the traditional county extends to the River Mersey and Liverpool and follows the Mersey and the River Tame to Ashton-under-Lyne. Most of the southern area of the ancient county now forms the metropolitan counties of Merseyside and Greater Manchester.

The people of the ancient county of Lancashire had been represented in Parliament since at least the 13th Century. It was this period that saw the practice of returning two knights from the shire counties to Parliaments summoned by writ to meet. These were generally regarded as the first assemblies of representatives. At that time Westminster, within the county of Middlesex, had yet to become the permanent home of Parliament. It was the King who decided when and where a Parliament should assemble, and although Westminster was the usual venue, sometimes special circumstances in this period meant Parliaments were summoned to other cities. Early returns have not survived, but the first named representatives of Lancashire, Mattheus de Redman and Johannes de Ewyas are shown in the returns to the Parliament of England summoned to meet at Westminster on 27 November 1295 in the reign of Edward I.

In this early period of Parliamentary history not all Parliaments summoned just shire Knights. Some also required the presence of two representatives of each city and borough. In the 1295 Parliament the two county Members for Lancashire were joined by two Members from each of the four boroughs of Lancaster, Liverpool, Preston and Wigan.

Preston occasionally sent Members to subsequent Parliaments but it was not until the sixteenth century that all four boroughs regularly returned Members to Parliament. At this time Clitheroe and Newton-le-Willows also gained the status of Parliamentary boroughs with each returning two Members. Manchester was granted a town charter in 1301 but had no municipal authority and did not achieve the status of a Parliamentary borough. This was despite the parish of Manchester having a population larger than Liverpool parish by over 100,000 by 1831. Manchester appears in the returns once in the Parliament 1656. This was the second Protectorate Parliament that followed Oliver Cromwell's Instrument of Government that declared Cromwell Lord Protector. The Instrument was an attempt to redistribute seats on a more equitable basis and towns such as Leeds and Manchester gained representation as a result, but this ended following the Restoration.

Lancashire had a total of fourteen Members in the unreformed House of Commons, and this remained the pattern

The constituency was split into two two-member county divisions for Parliamentary purposes, in 1832, when Newton was merged back into the county and new borough constituencies were split out covering Ashton-under-Lyne, Blackburn, Bolton, Bury, Manchester, Oldham, Rochdale, Salford, and Warrington. The county was then represented by the North Lancashire and South Lancashire constituencies : the latter representing the hundreds of Salford and West Derby, and the former the hundreds of Amounderness, Blackburn, Leyland and Lonsdale.

== Boundaries ==
The constituency comprised the whole historic county of Lancashire, except for the Parliamentary boroughs of Clitheroe, Lancaster, Liverpool, Newton, Preston and Wigan.

== Members of Parliament ==
=== 1290–1653 ===
Parliament	First member	Second member
1294	Mathew de Redman	
1295	Mathew de ?Sechnan	John de ?Evyas
1297	Henry de Keighley	Henry de Boteler
1298	Henry de Keighley	John Denyas
1300	Gilbert de Singleton	Egbert de Haydock
1301	Henry de Keighley	Thomas Travers
1302	William de Clifton	Gilbert de Singleton
1305	William de Clifton	William Banastre
1307 (Jan)	Gilbert de Singleton	John Travers
1307 (Oct)	Mathew de Redman	William le Gentil
1311	William le Gentil	Thomas de Betham
1312	Henry de Trafford	Sir Richard le Molyneux
1313 (Mar)	William de Bradshaigh	Edmund de Daere
1313 (Jul)	Ralph de Bickerstaff	William de Slene
1313 (Sep)	Henry de ?Vegherby	Thomas de Thornton
1314	Thomas Banastre	William de Slene
1316 (Jan)	William de Bradshaigh	Adam de Hoghton
1316 (Jun)	John de Lancaster	William de Walton
1316 (Jul)	Sir Roger de Pilkington	Sir John de Pilkington
1318 (Oct)	Edmund de Neville	John de Hornby
1319	William de Walton	William de Slene
1320	Gilbert de Haydock	Thomas de Thornton
1321	John de Hornby	Gilbert de Haydock
1322	Richard de Hoghton	John de Lancaster
1324 (Jan)	Edmund de Nevill	Gilbert de Haydock repl. by Thomas de Lathom
1324 (Oct)	William de Slene	Nicholas de Norreys
1325	William de Bradshaigh	John de Hornby
1326	Edmund de Neville	Richard de Hoghton
1327 (Sep)	Michael de Haverington	William Lawrence
1328 (Feb)	William de Bradshaigh	Edmund de Neville
1328 (Apr)	Thomas de Thornton	John de Hornby
1328 (Jul)	William Lawrence	Thomas de Thornton
1328 (Oct)	Nicholas de Norreys	Henry de Haydock
1329 (Feb)	Nicholas de Norreys	Henry de Haydock
1329–30 (Mar)	William de Saperton	Henry de Haydock
1330	William de Bradshaigh	John de Lancaster
1331	William de Bradshaigh	Oliver de Stansmeld
1332	Robert de Dalton	Adam de Banastre
1332 (Sep)	John de Hornby, jnr	Robert de Dalton
1332–3 (Jan)	Edmund de Neville	John de Hornby, jnr
1333–4 (Feb)	Edmund de Nevill	Robert de Dalton
1334	Robert de Radcliffe	Henry de Haydock
1335 (May)	Robert de Sherburne	Edmund de Neville
1336 (Mar)	John de Sherburne	Henry de Haydock
1336 (Sep)	John de Hornby, jnr	Henry de Haydock
1336–7 (Mar)	Robert de Ireland	Sir Henry de Haydock
1337 (Sep)	Richard de Hoghton	Edmund de Neville
1337–8 (Feb)	Robert de Billisthorpe	Robert de Radcliffe
1338 (Jul)	John de Hornby	John de Clyderhow
1339	Robert de Clyderhowe	Henry de Bickerstaff
1339 (Oct)	Nicholas de Hulme	Robert de Prescot
1339–40 (Jan)	John de Radcliffe	Robert de Radcliffe
1340 (Mar)	John de Dalton	Robert de Dalton
1343 (Apr)	John de Haverington	John Ungoun
1344	Nicholas le Boteler	William de Radcliffe
1346	John de Clyderhow	Adam de Bradkirk
1347–8 (Jan)	Adam de Hoghton	John Cockayne
1348 (Apr)	Robert de Plesington	Robert de Prescot
1351	Otho de Halsall	William de Radcliffe
1351–2 (Jan)	?	
1352 (Aug)	John de Haverington	One knight only summoned
1353	William Cables	One knight only summoned
1354 (Apr)	William Cables	Richard Nowell
1355	Robert de Hornby	Roger de Farington
1357 (Apr)	John de Haverington	Robert de Singleton
1357–8 (Feb)	Robert de Farington	Robert de Hornby
1360	William de Hesketh	Roger de Farington
1360–1 (Jan)	William de Radcliffe	Richard de Towneley
1362 (Oct)	Edmund Lawrence	Matthew de Rixton of Rixton Hall
	Result set aside as unlawful	
1363 (Oct)	Adam de Hoghton	Roger de Pilkington
1364–5 (Jan)	Sir Adam de Houghton	Sir Roger de Pilkington
1366 (May)	Sir John le Boteler	William de Radcliffe
1368	Sir Roger de Pilkington	Roger de Ratcliffe
1369 (Jun)	Sir John de Dalton	John de Ipres
1371	John de Ipres	Richard de Towneley
1372 (Nov)	Sir Nicholas Haryngton	Sir John le Boteler
1373 (Nov)	William de Atherton	John de Holcroft
1376 (Apr)	Sir John le Boteler	Roger de Brockholes
1376–7 (Jan)	Sir John le Boteler	Roger de Pilkington
1377 (Oct)	Sir John le Boteler	Sir Nicholas Harrington
1378	Ralph de Ypres	Sir John le Boteler
1379	Sir Nicholas Harrington	Robert Urswyk
1380 (Jan)	Sir John le Boteler	Thomas Southworth
1380 (Nov)	Sir John le Boteler	Thomas Southworth
1381 (Sep)	Sir William de Atherton	Robert Urswyk
1382 (May)	Sir Roger de Pilkington	Robert de Clifton
1382 (Oct)	Sir John de Assheton	Robert Urswyck
1382–3 (Feb)	Sir Richard de Hoghton	Robert Clifton
1383 (Oct)	John de Holcroft	Sir Walter de Urswyk
1384 (Apr)	Sir Roger Pilkington	Thomas Gerard
1384 (Nov)	Robert Urswyk	William de Tunstall
1385	Robert Urswyk	Thomas de Radcliffe
1386 (Oct)	Sir Nicholas Harrington	Robert Worsley
1388 (Feb)	Sir John le Boteler	Sir Thomas Gerard
1388 (Sep)	Sir John Assheton	Sir John Croft
1390 (Jan)	Sir John Assheton	Sir Ralph de Ypres
1390 (Nov)	Sir Robert Urswyk	Sir John Croft
1391	Sir Robert Urswyk	Robert Worsley
1393	Sir Robert Urswyk	Sir Ralph de Ypres
1394	Sir Robert Urswyk	Sir Thomas Gerard
1395	Sir Robert Urswyk	Thomas Radcliffe
1397 (Jan)	Sir Robert Urswyk	Richard Molyneux
1397 (Sep)	Sir John le Boteler	Sir Ralph Radcliffe
1399	Sir Robert Urswyk	Sir Henry Hoghton
1401	Sir Robert Urswyk	Sir Nicholas Atherton
1402	Sir Richard Houghton	Sir Nicholas Harrington
1404 (Jan)	Robert Laurence	Sir Ralph Radcliffe
1404 (Oct)	Sir James Haryngton	Sir Ralph Stavely
1406	Robert Laurence	Sir William Boteler
1407	Sir Henry Hoghton	Sir Ralph Stavely
1410		
1411	John de Ashton	John Booth
1413 (Feb)		
1413 (May)	John de Ashton	John Stanley
1414 (Apr)	Ralph Radcliffe	Nicholas Blundell
1414 (Nov)	Robert Laurence	John Stanley
1415		
1416 (Mar)	John de Ashton	John Morley
1416 (Oct)		
1417		
1419	Nicholas le Boteler	John Laurence
1420	Richard Shirburne	John Booth
1421 (May)	Sir Thomas Radcliffe	Thomas Urswick
1421 (Dec)	Richard Shirburne	Sir John Byron
1422 (Nov)	Thomas Urswick	John Gerard
1423 (Oct)	Sir Thomas de Radcliffe	Ralph de Radcliffe
1425 (Apr)	Ralph Fitz Nicholas	Richard de Radcliffe
1425–6 (Feb)	Sir John Boteler	Nicholas Boteler
1427 (Oct)	Ralph de Radcliffe	Thomas Stanley
1429 (Sep)	Sir John Byron	Sir Robert Lawrence
1430–1 (Jan)	John de Morley	William Gernet
1432 (May)	Sir William de Assheton	Thomas de Harrington
1433 (Jul)	Sir Thomas Stanley	Sir Thomas Radcliffe
1435 (Oct)	Henry de Halsall	Thomas Lawrence
1436–7 (Jan)	Thomas de Harrington	Henry de Halsall
1439 (Nov)	Thomas Stanley	Thomas de Harrington
1442 (Jan)	Thomas Stanley	Thomas de Harrington
1447	Thomas Stanley	Thomas de Harrington
1448	Thomas Stanley	Thomas de Harrington
1450	Thomas Stanley	Thomas de Harrington
1455	Thomas Stanley	Alexander Radcliffe
1459	Sir Richard Harrington	Henry Halsall
1460	Sir Richard Harrington	Henry Halsall
1463 (Apr)	?	
1467 (Jun)	Sir James Harrington	Sir William Harrington
1472 (Oct)	Robert Harrington	John Assheton (grandson of MP of 1413)
1477–8 (Jan)	Sir George Stanley	Sir James Harrington
1482–3 (Jan)	?	
1483-1523	Not known	
1503	Sir Thomas Butler	Sir John Booth
1529	Henry Farington	Andrew Barton
1536	?	
1539	?	
1542	?	
1545	Sir Thomas Holcroft	John Kitchen
1547	Thurstan Tyldesley	John Kitchen
1553 (Mar)	Sir Richard Houghton sick 1553 and replaced by Sir Robert Worsley	Thomas Butler
1553 (Oct)	Sir Richard Sherborn	John Rigmayden
1554 (Apr)	Sir Thomas Stanley	Sir Thomas Langton
1554 (Nov)	Sir Thomas Stanley	Sir John Holcroft
1555	Sir Thomas Stanley	Sir William Stanley
1558	Sir Thomas Talbot	Sir John Holcroft
1559 (Jan)	Sir John Atherton	Sir Robert Worsley
1562–1563	Sir Thomas Gerard of Bryn	Sir John Southworth
1571	John Ratcliffe	Thomas Butler
1572	John Ratcliffe	Edmund Trafford
1584 (Nov)	Gilbert Gerard made Master of the Rolls and replaced Jan 1585 by Richard Bold	Richard Molyneux
1586	John Atherton	Richard Holland
1588 (Oct)	Thomas Gerard, sat for Staffs and repl. by ?)	Thomas Walmsley
1593	Sir Richard Molyneux	Sir Thomas Gerard
1597 (Nov)	Sir Thomas Gerard	Robert Hesketh
1601	Sir Richard Hoghton	Thomas Hesketh
1604	Sir Richard Molyneux	Sir Richard Hoghton
1614	Sir Thomas Gerard, 1st Baronet	Sir Cuthbert Halsall
1621-1622	Sir John Ratcliffe	Sir Gilbert Hoghton
1624	Sir John Ratcliffe	Sir Thomas Walmsley
1625	Sir Richard Molyneux, Bt	Sir John Ratcliffe
1626	Robert Stanley	Sir Gilbert Hoghton
1628-1629	Sir Richard Molyneux	Sir Alexander Radcliffe
1629–1640	No Parliaments summoned	
1640 (Apr)	Sir Gilbert Hoghton, 2nd Baronet	William Farrington
1640 (Nov)	Ralph Assheton	Roger Kirkby, disabled August 1642
1645	Ralph Assheton	Sir Richard Hoghton, 3rd Baronet
1648	Ralph Assheton	Sir Richard Hoghton, 3rd Baronet

=== 1653–1659 ===
Parliament	First member	Second member	Third member (1653–1659)	Fourth member (1654–1659)
1653	William West	John Sawry	Robert Cunliffe	—N/a
1654	Richard Holland	Gilbert Ireland	Richard Standish	William Ashurst
1656	Richard Holland	Gilbert Ireland	Richard Standish	Sir Richard Hoghton, 3rd Baronet
1659	Sir George Booth, Bt	Alexander Rigby	—N/a	—N/a

=== 1660–1832 ===
Election	First member	First party	Second member	Second party
1660	Sir Robert Bindlosse, 1st Baronet		Roger Bradshaigh	
1661	Hon. Edward Stanley		Roger Bradshaigh	
1665	Thomas Preston		Roger Bradshaigh	
1679 (Feb)	Viscount Brandon		Peter Bold	
1679 (Sep)	Sir Charles Hoghton, 4th Baronet		Peter Bold	
1681	Viscount Brandon		Sir Charles Hoghton, 4th Baronet	
1685	James Holt		Roger Bradshaigh	
1689	Viscount Brandon		Sir Charles Hoghton, 4th Baronet	
1690	Viscount Brandon		Hon. James Stanley	
1694	Ralph Assheton		Hon. James Stanley	
1698	Hon. Fitton Gerard		Hon. James Stanley	
1701 (Feb)	Richard Bold	Tory	Hon. James Stanley	
1703	Richard Bold	Tory	Richard Assheton	
1704	Richard Fleetwood		Richard Assheton	
1705	Hon. Charles Zedenno Stanley	Whig	Richard Shuttleworth	Tory
1713	Sir John Bland		Richard Shuttleworth	Tory
1727	Sir Edward Stanley		Richard Shuttleworth	Tory
1736	Peter Bold	Tory	Richard Shuttleworth	Tory
1741	Lord Strange		Richard Shuttleworth	Tory
1750	Lord Strange		Peter Bold	Tory
1761	Lord Strange		James Shuttleworth	
1768	Lord Strange		Lord Archibald Hamilton	
1771	The Earl of Sefton		Lord Archibald Hamilton	
1772	The Earl of Sefton		Sir Thomas Egerton	
1774	Lord Stanley		Sir Thomas Egerton	
1776	Thomas Stanley		Sir Thomas Egerton	
1780	Thomas Stanley		Sir Thomas Egerton	
1784	Thomas Stanley		John Blackburne	
1812	Lord Stanley		John Blackburne	
1830	Lord Stanley		John Wilson-Patten	Tory
1831	Lord Stanley		Benjamin Heywood	

- Constituency abolished (1832)

== Elections ==
The county franchise, from 1430, was held by the adult male owners of freehold land valued at 40 shillings or more. Each elector had as many votes as there were seats to be filled. Votes had to be cast by a spoken declaration, in public, at the hustings, which took place in the county town of Lancaster. The expense and difficulty of voting at only one location in the county, together with the lack of a secret ballot contributed to the corruption and intimidation of electors, which was widespread in the unreformed British political system.

The expense, to candidates, of contested elections encouraged the leading families of the county to agree on the candidates to be returned unopposed whenever possible. Contested county elections were therefore unusual. The Stanleys, led by the Earl of Derby dominated the county. One seat was nearly always held by a Stanley relative, the second, by one of the other leading families.

== See also ==
- List of former United Kingdom Parliament constituencies
- Unreformed House of Commons
