= John de Pilkington =

English Member of Parliament

John de Pilkington was a Member of Parliament in 1316 for Lancashire.
