= John de Ashton (military commander) =

Ashton arms: Argent, a mullet sable pierced of the field

Sir John de Ashton, or Assheton (c. 1354 – c. 1398), of Ashton-under-Lyne, Lancashire, was an English politician and military commander. He was the son of Sir John Ashton, who was reportedly a prominent soldier and died c. 1360).

When he was about 15 years old, the younger Ashton entered military service: during 1369 he was in France for the Caroline phase of the Hundred Years War, as part of English forces led by John of Gaunt.

John de Ashton was almost certainly not the "Sir John Assueton" who was said to have taken part in a siege at Noyon, in 1370 (according to Froissart's Chronicles). The Oxford Dictionary of National Biography has described this identification as "suspect"; at the time, Ashton had not been knighted and was about 16 years old.

He fought in Ireland in 1373 and was knighted by 1377, when he was retained by John of Gaunt.

Ashton was elected as a Member (MP) of the Parliament of England for Lancashire in October 1382, with Gaunt's support. He joined Despenser's Crusade in Flanders in 1383, and campaigned in Scotland in 1385; however, he did not accompany Gaunt on his Spanish campaign in 1386.

Ashton returned to Parliament in September 1388, and again in January 1390, though not much is known about his activity at them. His daughter, Cecelia, married Sir Richard Radcliffe, Justice of the Peace and Knight. His eldest son, John de Ashton, was MP for Lancashire in 1411, 1413 and 1416, as well as seneschal of Bayeux in 1417-18.
