= Thomas Langton (died 1569) =

English politician

Sir Thomas Langton (1496/97–1569), of Newton and Walton-le-Dale, Lancashire, was an English politician.

He was a member (MP) of the parliament of England for Lancashire in April 1554.
