= Ralph de Ashton =

Sir Ralph de Ashton or Assheton (fl. 1421–1486), was an officer of state under Edward IV of England.

Ashton arms: Argent, a mullet sable pierced of the field

== Early life ==
Ashton was the half-brother of Sir Thomas de Ashton (fl. 1446) the alchemist, and the son of the Sir John de Ashton mentioned by Froissart. His mother was Margaret, daughter of Sir John Byron of Clayton. In his seventeenth year, he was one of the pages of honour to Henry VI, and at the same early age, he married Margaret, the heiress of the Bartons of Middleton, and became the founder of the family that held the lordship there until the 18th century, when it passed by the female line to the holders of the Suffield peerage. His grandson Richard Ashton rebuilt St Leonard's church at Middleton in 1524.

== Offices ==
Ralph Ashton was a man of influence, and in the reign of Edward IV he held various offices. He was High Sheriff of Yorkshire in 1472, and for his courage at the capture of Berwick upon Tweed he was made a knight banneret at Hutton Field.

When his commander, the Duke of Gloucester, became Richard III, he rewarded Sir Ralph's adhesion to the Yorkist cause by extensive grants of land. In 1483 he was appointed vice-constable of England and lieutenant of the Tower of London. The date of his death is unknown, but he is traditionally said to have been shot at Ashton-under-Lyne, and the yearly ceremony known as the "Riding of the Black Lad" is regarded as a commemoration of that event.

There is a very full rent-roll or custumal of the manor of Ashton in 1422, in which the various names and obligations of the tenants are set forth.

== Legacy ==
Ralph Ashton is mentioned in a passage that Dr. Hibbert-Ware has explained with much ingenuity, though not with absolute certainty. According to this, corn marigold (Chrysanthemun segetum) grew so extensively in the low wetland about Ashton as to be inimical to the crops, and the lord of the manor had an annual inspection and levied fines on those tenants on whose lands it was seen. This power, delegated to Ralph Ashton and his brother Robert, is said to have been made the pretext of such tyrannical exactions that on one of these visitations the tenants rose in desperation and the "Black Knight" was slain. Others hold that it was whilst exercising in the northern parts his despotic powers as vice-constable that he excited the terror expressed in the legendary rhyme:—

Sweet Jesu, for thy mercy's sake

And for thy bitter passion,

Save us from the axe of the Tower,

And from Sir Ralph of Ashton.

The effigy of the Black Knight used to be paraded through the town of Ashton on Easter Monday.
