= John Southworth (MP) =

16th-century English politician

John Southworth (c. 1526 – 3 November 1595), of Samlesbury, Lancashire, was an English politician.

He was a member (MP) of the parliament of England for Lancashire in 1563.
