= Robert Worsley (died 1585) =

English politician

Sir Robert Worsley (by 1512 – 1585), of Booths, Lancashire, was an English politician.

He was a member (MP) of the parliament of England for Lancashire in March 1553 and 1559.
