= Vivian Molyneux =

English scholar and traveller

Sir Vivian Molyneux (c. 1596 – after 1642) was an English scholar and traveller, who supported the Royalist cause in the English Civil War.

== Biography ==
Molyneux was the son of Sir Richard Molyneux, 1st Baronet of Sefton and his wife Frances, the daughter of Sir Gilbert Gerard and Anne Radcliffe. He was educated in Brazen Nose College, Oxford, he matriculated (entered) on 24 November 1609, aged 14, and was awarded his B.A. on 1 July 1612. He was admitted to Gray's Inn on 2 February 1612. He was entered on the roll of the Preston Guild in 1602, 1622 and 1642.

He travelled in foreign countries and became a Roman Catholic while in Rome (having been brought up a puritan). He returned to England and was knighted on 27 July 1639 by King Charles I at Berwick. In 1640 he was a Lieutenant-Colonel in the English army commanded by Earl of Northumberland (during the Second Bishops' War with Scotland). In the Civil War he suffered for the Royalist cause.
