= Thomas de Ashton (alchemist) =

English alchemist (fl. 1446)

Sir Thomas de Ashton or Assheton (fl. 1446), was an English alchemist.

Ashton arms: Argent, a mullet sable pierced of the field

Ashton was born in about 1403, the son and heir of Sir John de Ashton, of Ashton-under-Lyne, who died in 1428. His half-brother Ralph de Ashton seems to have inherited the main family home, Ashton Hall. From roughly this date, differences appear in the coat of arms, motto and spelling of the two families, indicating that Sir Thomas may have distanced himself from his unpopular half-brother.

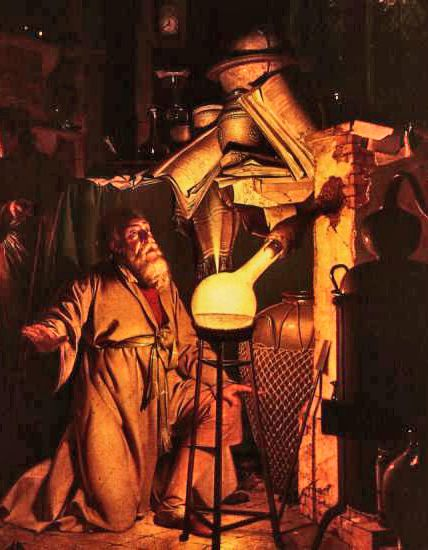
The Alchemist in Search of the Philosophers Stone (1771) by Joseph Wright of Derby

== Alchemy ==
Permission was granted by Henry VI to Sir Thomas to transmute the precious metals, and on 7 April 1446 a special order was issued, encouraging two Lancashire knights, Ashton and Sir Edmund de Trafford, to pursue their experiments in alchemy, and forbidding any subject of the king to molest them.

== Descendants ==
Sir Thomas, born in Kingsley, Lancashire, England, married Elizabeth, daughter of Sir John Byron, by whom he had eleven children. The eldest son, John, was knighted before the battle of Northampton, 10 July 1460, was MP for Lancashire in 1472 and died in 1508.

Children

- Elizabeth, b. 1431, married John Trafford, Knight, d. 1488
- Douce, b. 1435, married Thomas (Sir) Gerard, Knight, born 15 July 1431 in Kingsley, Lancs, England, died 27 March 1490 in Kingsley, Lancs., England
- Joan, b. 1437, married Sir John Legh of Norbury Booths.

== Note ==
Thomas de Ashton (alchemist) is not, Sir Thomas de Ashton Lord of Croston d. 17 Oct 1407 and, is not the medieval Thomas de Aston, a 13th-century monk d. 7 June 1401: these two men are in Lincoln Cathedral.

Source information

Heritage Consulting. Millennium File [database on-line]. Provo, UT, USA: Ancestry.com Operations Inc, 2003. Original data: Heritage Consulting. The Millennium File. Salt Lake City, UT, USA: Heritage Consulting.
