= Robert Worsley (MP for Lancashire) =

English politician

Robert Worsley (died 1402), of Booths in Worsley, Lancashire, was an English politician.

He was a member (MP) of the parliament of England for Lancashire in 1386 and 1391.
