= John le Boteler =

English landowner and MP

- Born: circa 1328; Warrington
- Died: circa 1399
- Spouse: Alice de Plumpton
- Parents: Sir William le Boteler (father); Elizabeth de Havering (mother)

Sir John le Boteler (c. 1328 – 1399) was an English landowner and Member of Parliament.

He was born the second son and heir of Sir William Boteler (1309–1380) of Warrington and was knighted by 1363. He succeeded his father after the early death of his elder brother William.

He was elected knight of the shire (MP) for Lancashire 10 times between 1366 and 1397. He was also appointed High Sheriff of Lancashire for 1371 to 1374. He was constable of Liverpool castle, warden of the parks of Toxteth, Croxteth and Simonswood and of the forest of West Derby from 1374 to his death.

He died in 1399. He had married Alice, the daughter of Sir William Plumpton of Plumpton, Yorkshire, and the widow of Sir Richard Shirburne of Aighton, Lancashire, with whom he had two sons. He was succeeded by his son, William. His younger son John became a courtier and keeper of the king's jewels for Henry V.
