= Thomas Radcliffe (MP died 1403) =

14th-century British politician

Member of Parliament for Lancashire
- In office 1385; 1395

Personal details
- Born: England
- Died: 1403

Thomas Radcliffe (died 1403), or Thomas de Radcliffe of Radcliffe Tower, of Winmarleigh and Astley, Lancashire, England, was a Member of Parliament for Lancashire in 1385 and 1395.
