= Sir Richard Molyneux, 1st Baronet =

Sir Richard Molyneux, 1st Baronet (1560–1622) was a member of parliament for Lancashire, Mayor of Liverpool and Receiver-General of the Duchy of Lancaster.

== Life ==
Molyneux was the son of William Molyneux and his wife Bridget Caryll. His grandfather, Sir Richard Molyneux (1528–1568), was MP for Liverpool from 1562 to 1571. He was educated at University College, Oxford.

In 1581, Molyneux was appointed by substitution MP of Wigan, replacing Sir Edward Fitton and knighted in 1586.

In 1588–89, he was Mayor of Liverpool and in 1588 and 1596 High Sheriff of Lancashire. He was knight of the shire (MP) for Lancashire in 1584, 1593 and 1604. He held the office of Receiver-General of the Duchy of Lancaster from 1607. He was created Baronet Molyneux in 1611.

On his death, he was buried in Sefton parish church. His seats were Sefton Hall, Sefton and Lytham Hall, Fylde. He left his estates to his son Richard.

== Family ==
Molyneux married firstly a daughter of Lord Strange and secondly, around 1590, Frances Gerard, the daughter of Sir Gilbert Gerard and Anne Radcliffe, with whom he had 13 children (six sons and seven daughters), including Sir Richard Molyneux, 1st Viscount Molyneux and Sir Vivian Molyneux.

Alice Molyneux, their eldest daughter, married Sir William Dormer and their son, Robert, was created Earl of Carnarvon in 1628. A younger daughter Margaret married Edward Osbaldeston, of a prominent Lancashire family and had issue including Richard Osbaldston, Attorney General for Ireland.

Baronetage of England
New creation	Baronet (of Sefton); 1611–1622	Succeeded by Richard Molyneux
