= John Ratcliffe (soldier) =

English soldier and politician

Sir John Ratcliffe or Radcliffe (22 February 1582 – 5 November 1627)) was an English soldier and politician who sat in the House of Commons between 1614 and 1626. He was killed in action in France during the Siege of Saint-Martin-de-Ré.

Ratcliffe was the third son of John Ratcliffe of Ordsall, Lancashire who was an MP. In 1599, he was heir to his elder brother Alexander who died in action in Ireland, where John, aged sixteen, was also serving, and where another older brother had already been murdered, leaving him the family estates. He was knighted 24 September 1599 on the sands by Sir Robert Gardiner's house in Dublin. He was admitted at Gray's Inn on 18 March 1606.

From 1606 to 1610 he travelled in France and the Low Countries, and from that period until 1615 he also served as a captain with the Dutch army. During truces he went home to do legal business and he invested in the Virginia Company.

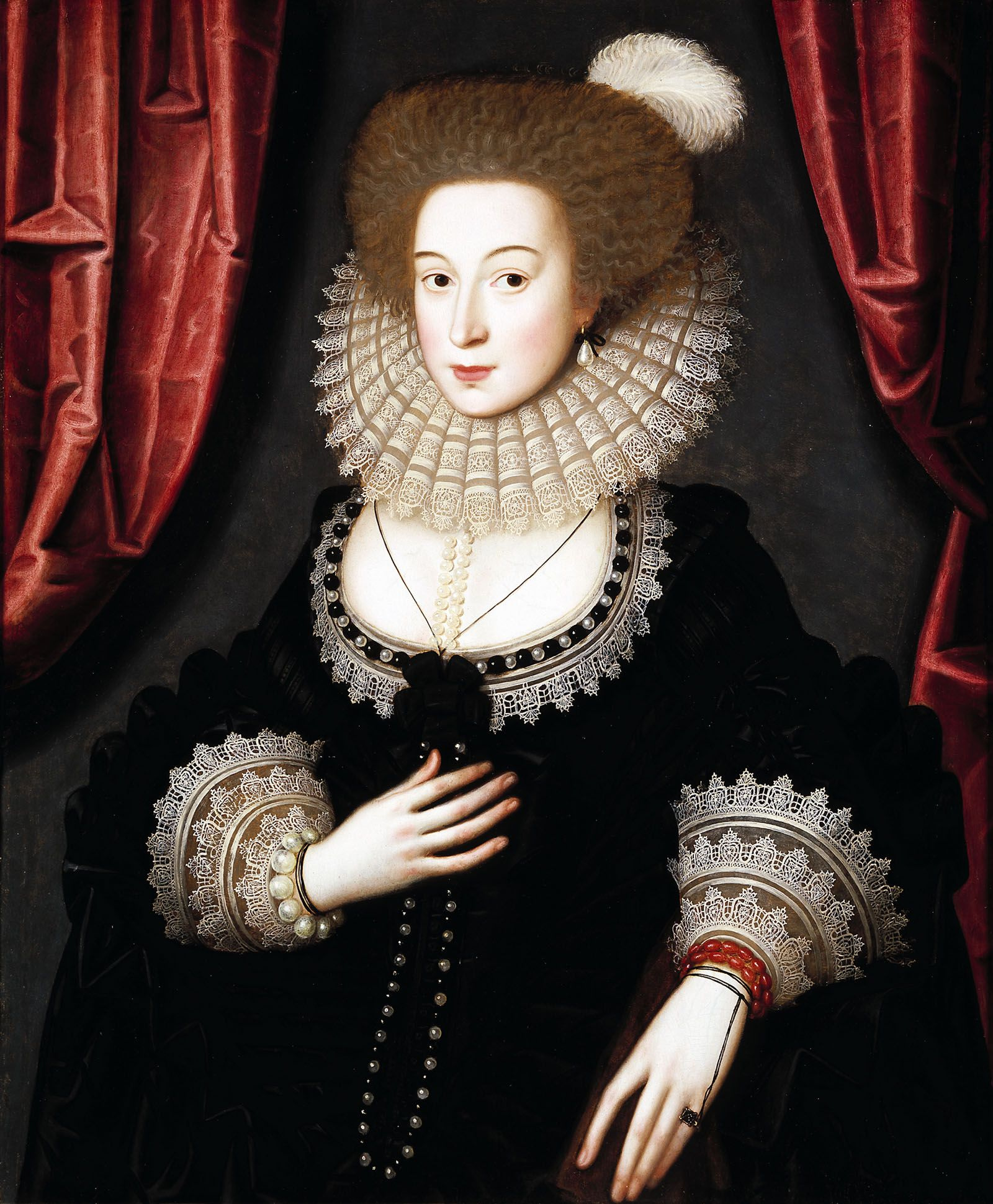
Mary Radcliffe or Ratcliffe, daughter of Sir John Ratcliffe, c. 1610, Denver Art Museum

In November 1614, Ratcliffe was elected Member of Parliament for Tewkesbury. He was elected MP for Lancashire in 1621 and again in 1624 and 1625. In 1626 he was elected MP for Tavistock.

Ratcliffe resumed military service within the English army, being a captain of horse by 1624, and a lieutenant-colonel in 1625. On 8 September 1627, Ratcliffe was appointed a colonel in an invasion force under the command of George Villiers, Duke of Buckingham which attacked the Isle of Rhe in order to relieve the Siege of La Rochelle. He was killed during the Siege of Saint-Martin-de-Ré and the Duke was later forced to withdraw in defeat.

Denver Art Museum has a portrait thought to depict his daughter Mary Ratcliffe, who married Sir John Stanhope, son of Sir John Stanhope of Elvaston.

Parliament of England
Preceded by Sir Dudley Digges; Edward Ferrers	Member of Parliament for Tewkesbury; 1614; With: Sir Dudley Digges	Succeeded by Sir Dudley Digges
Preceded by Sir Thomas Gerard; Sir Cuthbert Halsall	Member of Parliament for Lancashire; 1621–1625; With: Sir Gilbert Hoghton 1621–1622; Sir Thomas Walmisley 1624; Sir Richard Molyneux, Bt 1625	Succeeded by Robert Stanley; Sir Gilbert Hoghton
Preceded by John Pym; Sir Francis Glanville	Member of Parliament for Tavistock; 1626; With: John Pym	Succeeded by John Pym; Sir Francis Glanville
