= 1st Royal Lancashire Militia (The Duke of Lancaster's Own) =

Auxiliary unit of the British Army

1st Royal Lancashire Militia (The Duke of Lancaster's Own) 3rd and 4th Bns, King's Own (Royal Lancaster Regiment)
- Active: 1661–April 1953
- Country: Kingdom of England (1661–1707); Kingdom of Great Britain (1707–1800); United Kingdom (1801–1953)
- Branch: Militia
- Role: Infantry
- Size: 1-2 Battalions
- Garrison/HQ: Springfield Barracks, Lancaster, Lancashire (1856–83); Bowerham Barracks, Lancaster (1883–1953)
- Nicknames: The Old County Regiment; The Duke's Own
- Engagements: Campaign in Ireland; Siege of Carrickfergus; Battle of the Boyne; Siege of Athlone; Jacobite Rising of 1715; Battle of Preston; Jacobite Rising of 1745; Clifton Moor Skirmish; Second Boer War

Commanders
- Notable commanders: James Stanley, 10th Earl of Derby; James Smith-Stanley, Lord Strange; Thomas Stanley of Cross Hill; John Talbot Clifton; Frederick Stanley, 16th Earl of Derby

The 1st Royal Lancashire Militia (The Duke of Lancaster's Own) was an auxiliary (Note: It is incorrect to describe the British Militia as 'irregular': throughout their history they were equipped and trained exactly like the line regiments of the regular army, and once embodied in time of war they were fulltime professional soldiers for the duration of their enlistment.) regiment raised in the county of Lancashire in North West England during the 17th Century. Primarily intended for home defence, it saw active service in Ireland under King William III, as well as against the Jacobite Risings of 1715 and 1745. It spent long periods on defence duties during the wars of the 18th Century and early 19th Century, and was stationed on the Ionian Islands during the Crimean War. It later became part of the King's Own (Royal Lancaster Regiment) and saw active service in the Second Boer War. After its conversion to the Special Reserve under the Haldane Reforms, it supplied reinforcements to the fighting battalions during World War I. After a shadowy postwar existence the unit was finally disbanded in 1953.

== Background ==
Universal obligation to military service in the Shire levy was long established in England, and its legal basis was updated by two acts of 1557 (4 & 5 Ph. & M. cc. 2 and 3). This legislation placed selected men, the 'trained bands', under the command of a Lord Lieutenant appointed by the monarch; this is seen as the starting date for the organised county militia in England. The trained bands were an important element in the country's defence at the time of the Armada in the 1580s, and control of the bands was an area of dispute between King Charles I and Parliament that led to the English Civil War. Lord Wharton had been appointed Lord Lieutenant of Lancashire by Parliament in 1641, and on the outbreak of hostilities in July 1642 he attempted to seize the trained bands' magazine at Manchester. However, he was forestalled by Lord Strange and William Farington (appointed Commissioner of Array by the King), who had already gained control of the magazines at Liverpool and Preston for the Royalists. The resulting skirmish at Manchester on 15 July, when Strange and his men were driven out by Wharton's Parliamentarians, was among the first battles of the war.

Once Parliament had established full control in 1648 it passed new Militia Acts that replaced lords lieutenant with county commissioners, who were appointed by Parliament or the Council of State, after which the term 'Trained Band' began to disappear in most counties. Under the Commonwealth and Protectorate, the militia received pay when called out and operated alongside the New Model Army to control the country.

== Old County Regiment ==
After the Restoration of the Monarchy, the English Militia was re-established by the Militia Act 1661 under the control of the king's lords-lieutenant, the men to be selected by ballot. It was popularly seen as the 'Constitutional Force' to counterbalance a 'Standing Army', a concept that was tainted by association with the New Model Army that had supported Cromwell's military dictatorship, and almost the whole burden of home defence and internal security was entrusted to the militia.

The Lancashire Militia were called out in 1663 when there were rumours of plots against the new regime, and no sooner had they been sent home in October than they were called out again on receipt of new information. Some counties were slacking in training and equipping their men: in 1674 most of the weapons of the Lancashire Militia were found to be defective, and many had to be replaced again in 1689.

=== Nine Years' War ===
Following the Glorious Revolution, in which King William III supplanted James II, the militia were called out in 1689. The Lord Lieutenant of Lancashire, William Stanley, 9th Earl of Derby, organised three regiments of foot and three Troops of horse from the County palatine of Lancaster:

- Colonel the Earl of Derby – 7 companies
- Colonel Roger Nowell – 7 companies
- Colonel Alexander Rigby – 8 companies
- The Earl of Derby's Troop
- Captain Thomas Greenhalgh's Troop
- Captain Sir Roger Bradshaigh's Troop.

These regiments volunteered for service in William's campaign in Ireland. After training on Fulwood Moor, near Preston, the Lancashire brigade, commanded by the Earl of Derby's brother, Lieutenant-Colonel the Hon James Stanley (1st Foot Guards), sailed with the army from Wallasey and landed at Carrickfergus on 14 June 1690. It played a full part in the campaign, serving in the Siege of Carrickfergus, at the Battle of the Boyne, and the Siege of Athlone. After a short tour of garrison duty in Dublin, the Lancashire brigade embarked at Howth in September to return to England to be disembodied on 15 October. Lieutenant-Colonel Stanley then recruited a number of veterans from the brigade for the regiment he was joining in Flanders. He succeeded to the command after his colonel was killed at the Battle of Steenkerque, after which the unit became 'Stanley's Regiment' (later the Bedfordshire Regiment). Colonel Stanley succeeded his brother as 10th Earl of Derby and Lord Lieutenant of Lancashire in 1702.

At the end of the Nine Years War in 1697 the militia in Lancashire consisted of 1601 men organized into 22 companies and three regiments, with 150 horsemen in three Troops. The three colonels were Major-General the Earl of Macclesfield (lord lieutenant), Roger Kirkby, MP, and Sir Ralph Assheton, 2nd Baronet, of Middleton, MP.

=== Jacobite Rising of 1715 ===
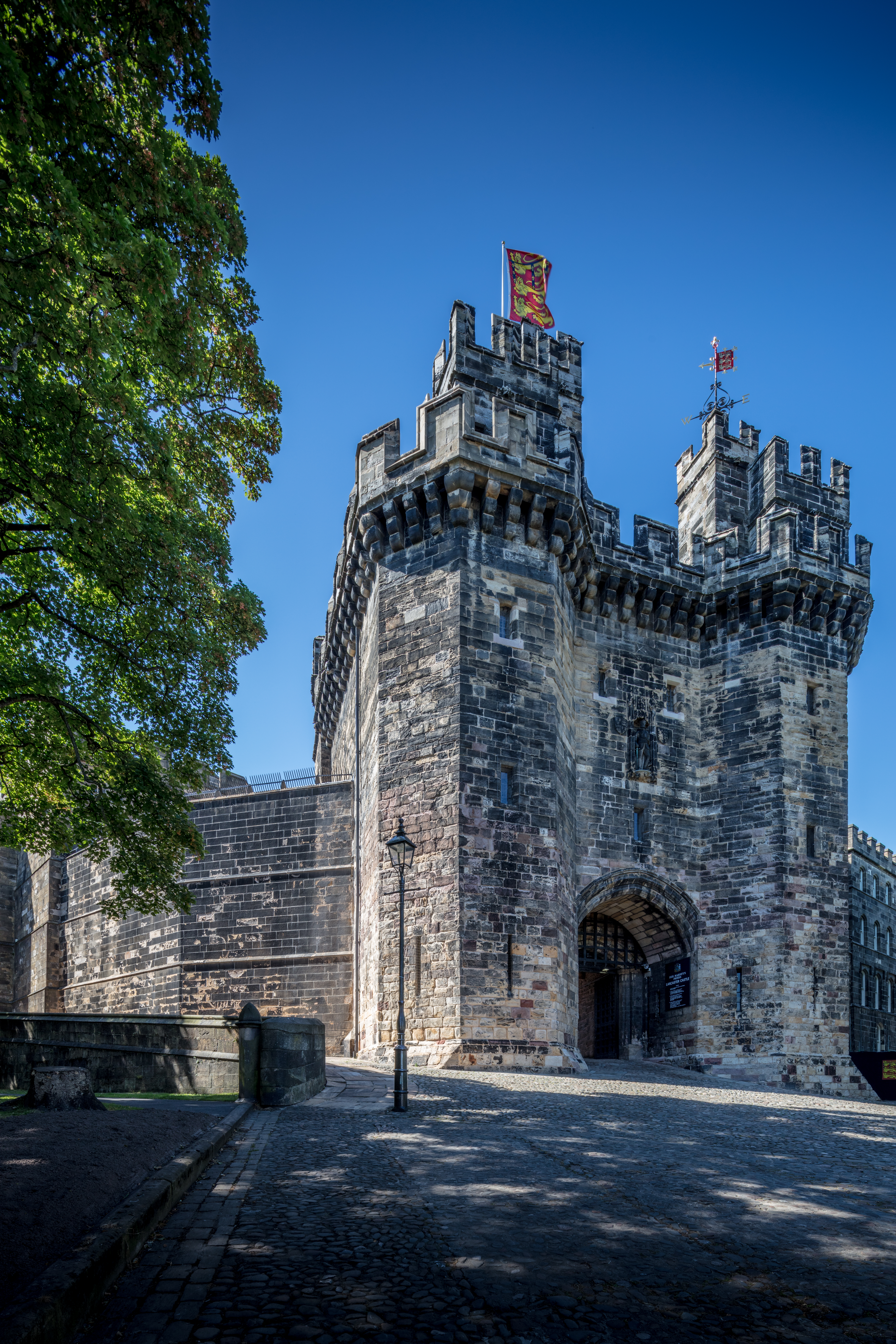
Lancaster Castle today, with the Duchy of Lancaster flag flying.

After the outbreak of the Jacobite Rising of 1715 the Lancashire Militia was ordered in August to assemble at Lancaster Castle under the command of Col Philip Hoghton. He found that fewer than half of the balloted men turned out, only 560 in all, enough to organise a single battalion. When a force of reputedly 3–4000 Scottish Highlanders and English Jacobites advanced from Carlisle, Hoghton was ordered to fall back from Lancaster to Preston to await further orders. He marched out early on 7 November and the Jacobites entered Lancaster the same day, taking over the ordnance stores in the castle. From Preston the Lancashire Militia and a newly arrived regiment of dragoons were ordered to Wigan, and the Jacobites occupied Preston on 9 November, where they built street barricades and placed the town in a state of defence. However, they were disappointed by the small number of Lancashire Jacobites who joined them, about 1200 badly-armed men. Major-General Charles Wills reached Wigan from Manchester on 11 November with a considerable force of government troops. Further troops under Lieutenant-General George Carpenter were also approaching from Clitheroe.

Wills advanced on Preston next day, and finding the bridge over the River Ribble unguarded, began his attack on the town. Brigadier-General Philip Honywood led the Lancashire Militia together with three dismounted troops of dragoons against the barricade at the west end of Fishergate. They first stormed the houses west of the churchyard and set fire to them as a diversion to assist the column attacking the churchyard barricade, and then moved against Fishergate, preceded by skirmishers. Colonel Hoghton detached the left wing of the Lancashire Militia and a troop of dragoons to attack the Friargate barricade while he led the right wing and remaining dragoons in columns of attack against Fishergate. Hoghton and his men reached the top of the barricade but were driven back by heavy musketry fire from the neighbouring houses, having suffered serious casualties; Honywood ordered them to withdraw. The attack at Friargate fared no better. But the Government troops renewed the attack after dark, Col Hoghton leading his men silently up to the Fishergate barricade then rushed it with the bayonet. The rebels took refuge in the houses, which were set on fire, and the street fighting continued by the light of the fires. Carpenter's troops arrived in the morning, to relieve the exhausted militia and completely invest the town, poised to complete the task of capturing it. A brigade of Dutch troops was also about to arrive, having marched from London. The rebel commanders, realising that they could hold out no longer, surrendered.

The Lancashire Militia had four officers killed, seven wounded, and 105 non-commissioned officers (NCOs) and privates killed and wounded, around a third of the total government casualties at the Battle of Preston. On 16 November the regiment marched back to Lancaster with 250 prisoners to be lodged in the castle. It remained there for the rest of the year, escorting parties of prisoners for trial, until it was disembodied about 15 January 1716.

=== Jacobite Rising of 1745 ===
The Lancashire Militia was next called out for service against the Jacobite Rising of 1745. Orders to embody the militia were issued to the lord lieutenant, Edward Stanley, 11th Earl of Derby, on 26 September after the government's forces had been defeated at the Battle of Prestonpans. Derby complained that although there were sufficient weapons (though of poor quality), the three regiments of foot and three troops of horse had not been called out for training in the 30 years since the Battle of Preston. He and his deputy lieutenants scrambled to raise money and find officers and army pensioners who could train the raw troops gathering at Bury. By 5 November Derby had assembled a regiment of eight companies. The Lancaster and Lonsdale Company, under the command of Captain William Bradshaw, was left at Lancaster to guard the ordnance stores and prison there. Major William Ffarington of Shaw Hall, Leyland, was sent with a detachment of two companies to guard Chorley. In the meantime, the Corporation of Liverpool had raised a 648-strong volunteer regiment, the Liverpool Blues, which was fully armed and could be put into the field.

On 17 November the Jacobite army reached Carlisle, which soon surrendered, and began moving south. Two days later Derby ordered the companies at Bury and Chorley to concentrate at Liverpool, and ordered Bradshaw to requisition as many waggons and carts as he could to move the ordnance stores out of Lancaster to 'a secure and secret place' at Ulverston. These moves were carried out next day, regimental headquarters (HQ) was established at the Talbot Hotel in Liverpool, and the Earl handed over command to Maj Ffarington. The commander of the government forces, Field Marshal George Wade, advised the militia to operate in small bodies to harry the advancing rebel army, firing from hedges and preventing it from sending out plundering parties. The Jacobites reached Lancaster on 24 November and Preston on 27 November, while detachments marched through Wigan, Chorley and Bolton. They hoped to gather recruits in Lancashire but were disappointed until they reached Manchester on 28 November, where there were sufficient volunteers to form the Manchester Regiment.

The Liverpool Blues, being better armed and equipped than the Lancashire Militia, were sent out on 29 November under Colonel Campbell to Warrington to prevent the rebels from using the bridge over the Mersey. As darkness approached they opened fire on what was thought to be a group of Highlanders but turned out to be a flock of geese. Next day they repulsed the Jacobite detachment from Preston, and broke down Warrington Bridge. On 1 December Col Campbell marched to Cheadle and Stockport, blowing up the bridges there and forcing the Jacobite artillery and baggage to cross by temporary rafts. After feinting towards Wales, the Jacobites reached Derby on 4 December. Government forces were now closing in on the Jacobite army and it was clear that there was not going to be an uprising in their favour in England. The Jacobite commanders decided to retreat to Scotland. Hindered by the Liverpool Blues' demolitions, they did not reach Manchester until 8 December, with stragglers being picked off by the Blues.

The advance guards of the government forces under Maj-Gens James Oglethorpe and Sir John Ligonier joined the Liverpool Blues at Lancaster on 14 December. Next day Capt Bradshaw and his company (95 all ranks) arrived from Ulverston with orders to put himself under Campbell's command. By now the Duke of Cumberland had arrived to take overall command, and he sent Oglethorpe with his dragoons and the Liverpool Blues to harry the Jacobite rearguard. They marched via Kendal (17 December) and continued over Shap Fell in moonlight and a snowstorm to surprise the Jacobites next morning. The dragoons pursued the Jacobite rearguard through Shap village as far as Clifton Moor, where the Jacobites were drawn up to cover the retreat of their guns across the bridges into Penrith. The Liverpool Blues deployed in front of Clifton, with Bradshaw's company and some dragoons covering the road at Clifton Dykes. They piled arms and cooked a meal, then at 20.00 that evening Oglethorpe ordered them to advance in support of his dragoons. Bradshaw's company formed on the right of the Liverpool Blues (the position taken by the grenadier company in a line regiment). The delaying action (the Clifton Moor Skirmish) was well handled by the Jacobite commander, Lord George Murray, who led a counter-charge of Highlanders, and Oglethorpe was blamed for the heavy losses suffered by his dragoons in their dismounted attack. The Liverpool Blues followed the Highlanders with volley fire, but the Jacobites succeeded in reaching Penrith with the loss of a few guns and waggons. Bradshaw commended Corporal Shaw of his company for rescuing three people from a burning house in Clifton. The company had lost one killed and three wounded in the two skirmishes at Shap and Clifton

Cumberland's army followed the Jacobites through Penrith to Carlisle. The Lancashire Militia company was left at Penrith to guard the prisoners, while the Liverpool Blues were present at the 10-day siege of Carlisle Castle. Cumberland marched into Scotland on 4 January 1746 (finally defeating the Jacobites at the Battle of Culloden on 16 April) while the Liverpool Blues escorted the prisoners from Carlisle (including those of the Manchester Regiment) to Lancashire for trial. Bradshaw's company similarly escorted the prisoners from Penrith to Lancaster. The Lancashire Militia was then disembodied on 12 January 1746; it was not called out again for training or active service until the Seven Years' War.

== 1st Royal Lancashire Militia ==
=== Seven Years' War ===
Under threat of French invasion during the Seven Years' War a series of Militia Acts from 1757 reorganised the county militia regiments, the men being conscripted by means of parish ballots (paid substitutes were permitted) to serve for three years. Lancashire's quota was set at 800 men in one regiment, but despite the enthusiasm of the acting lord lieutenant, Lord Strange, the county was slow to raise its quota. A regiment would have its arms issued from the Tower of London when it reached 60 per cent of its established strength, but in the case of Lancashire this was not until 18 July 1760, and the regiment was finally embodied for service on 23 December that year.

The regiment assembled on 28 December with six companies at Preston and four at Manchester. After training, it marched on 9 July 1761 to join other militia regiments at Warley Camp in Essex, arriving on 13 August. On 15 October King George III presented the Lancashire Militia with its new Regimental Colours, and on 23 October they were granted the title Royal Lancashire Militia (RLM) with the colonel's company designated 'the King's Company'. The regiment then marched to Nottingham for winter quarters. On 11 June 1762 the regiment was marched south again to join the militia camp at Winchester in Hampshire on 30 June. Preliminaries of peace having been signed, the regiment was ordered on 18 October to march back to Lancashire, where it was disembodied at Manchester on 15 December 1762.

In peacetime, the reformed militia regiments were supposed to be assembled for 28 days' annual training. In 1763 part of the RLM camped at Fulwood Moor near Preston from 18 May to 14 June, but it was not called out again until 1778.

=== War of American Independence ===
The militia was called out after the outbreak of the War of American Independence when the country was threatened with invasion by the Americans' allies, France and Spain. The Royal Warrant for the embodiment of the Royal Lancashire Militia was issued on 26 March and the regiment was embodied on 1 April 1778 under the command of the 12th Earl of Derby. After six weeks' training the regiment was marched to camp at Winchester. In October it was billeted among small Hampshire towns: Lymington (HQ + 3 companies), Romsey (3 companies), Ringwood, Christchurch, Downton and Fordingbridge (1 company each). Then in November it marched back to Liverpool for the winter, setting up its HQ at the Talbot Hotel once more.

While at Liverpool a large number of unfit and time-expired men were discharged and a new ballot held to refill the ranks, necessitating a great deal of training. In June 1779 the regiment moved to Newcastle upon Tyne, with two companies detached to Sunderland until February 1780 when they relieved the Regular garrison of Tynemouth Castle. In June 1780 the regiment marched to Chester Castle; three companies were detached at Macclesfield and two at Nantwich. It spent the winter from November 1780 at Manchester, with some companies detached to Warrington. In June 1781 two companies each from Manchester and Warrington moved to Chester, returning to Warrington the following November. By now the regiment was organised like the regulars with a Grenadier Company (the King's Company), a Light Company, and eight line or 'hat' companies. From April 1782 the regiment was broken up in detachments across Cumberland: Carlisle Castle (4 companies), Cockermouth (2 companies), Workington (2 companies), Whitehaven and Maryport (1 company each). Although Cumberland was remote from a possible French invasion, Whitehaven had been attacked by John Paul Jones in 1778. The regiment remained at these stations until 22 January 1783, when two companies were ordered from Carlisle Castle to Lancaster, and then on 17 February marched with HQ from Lancaster to Manchester. By now a peace treaty had been drawn up (it was signed in September) and orders were issued to the Earl of Derby on 28 February to disembody the RLM. This was carried out at Manchester in March 1783. The Earl of Derby then resigned the colonelcy to concentrate on his parliamentary duties; he nominated a distant kinsman, Thomas Stanley of Cross Hill, MP, to succeed him.

From 1784 to 1792 the militia were generally assembled for their 28 days' annual training, but to save money only two-thirds of the men were actually called out each year. However, it appears that the Royal Lancashire Militia did no training until the Stanleys called them out in 1790.

=== French Revolutionary War ===
The militia were re-embodied in January 1793 shortly before Revolutionary France declared war on Britain. The Royal Lancashire Militia assembled at Preston on 22 January, but on 25 January were ordered to disperse across Lancashire – Liverpool (4 companies), Wigan (3 companies), Blackburn (2 companies) and Chorley (1 company) – which hindered training.

During the French Wars the militia were employed anywhere in the country for coast defence, manning garrisons, guarding prisoners of war, and for internal security, while the regulars regarded them as a source of trained men if they could be persuaded to transfer. Their traditional local defence duties were taken over by the part-time Volunteers and later by a compulsory Local Militia.

In February 1793 the civil authorities in the West Riding of Yorkshire feared an outbreak of disorder and requested a military force. The RLM was sent, with HQ and four companies going to Leeds, three companies to Halifax, then to Sheffield and Barnsley, and three to Wakefield, Horset and Horbury. When regular troops arrived to keep the peace in May the RLM was moved to Doncaster, with detached companies at Bawtry, Blyth, Retford and Moorgate. During the rest of the year companies and pairs of companies went out to other towns before returning to Doncaster. In April 1794 the regiment was moved to the East Midlands, with six companies at Stamford and four at Peterborough. In June 1794 the RLM joined the great anti-invasion camp on the South Downs above Brighton, which included regular and fencible regiments as well as militia. In November it moved to winter quarters across Kent, with HQ at Canterbury Barracks. In 1795 it went to Dover Castle, spending May in camp at Hythe, returning to Canterbury in October with the companies in billets across north Kent. The regiment was then moved to billets around Greenwich and Deptford in November as part of a concentration round London to prevent disorder. In the spring of 1796 detachments were marched through Surrey before returning to Greenwich, then in June the regiment crossed to Warley Camp before going into winter quarters at Chelmsford.

Lancashire's militia quota set in 1760 was small in proportion to its population, which soared during the Industrial Revolution. By 1796 it represented only one man in every 43 of those eligible. But in that year an additional ballot was carried out to raise men for the 'Supplementary Militia' to reinforce the standing militia regiments and to form additional temporary regiments. Lancashire's quota was increased to five regiments, and on 1 March 1797 the RLM was ordered to send a party to Lancaster to begin training them. Although recruitment of such large numbers became difficult, the 1st Royal Lancashire Supplementary Militia was raised on 1 March 1797 at Liverpool under the personal command of the 13th Earl of Derby as lord lieutenant. On 17 August 1798 it was placed on a permanent footing as the 2nd Royal Lancashire Militia (2nd RLM), after which the 'Old County Regiment' became the 1st Royal Lancashire Militia (1st RLM). (Note: The abbreviation '1st RLM' was used in official correspondence as early as 1799.)

In March 1797 the 1st RLM was scattered across villages north of London, but on 11 April it was ordered to Plymouth, where it was quartered at the Maker Redoubts overlooking Plymouth Sound for the rest of the year. By the end of the year, with so many senior officers in parliament and the parties away training the supplementary militia, the strength of the regiment at Plymouth was down to about 400 men, under the command of the senior captain. Two of the companies may have been organised and equipped as rifle companies at this time.

=== Irish Rebellion ===
In March 1798 legislation was passed to allow the militia to volunteer for service in Ireland, where a Rebellion had broken out. The 1st Royal Lancashire Militia immediately volunteered, and the regiment was recruited to full strength (1200 men) from the supplementary militia to replace the time-expired men. The contractors having failed to provide enough uniforms in time, the 136 time-expired men were stripped of their uniforms, hats and boots to clothe the recruits, leading to a serious complaint to the War Office about their treatment. The recruits arrived at Plymouth from Lancashire and the regiment embarked at the end of June. But the news from Ireland having improved the voyage was cancelled and the regiment returned to camp on Maker Heights. It was not until the end of August that the 1st RLM embarked again as part of a militia brigade in response to the French intervention in Ireland. The regiment landed at Ballyhack in Waterford Harbour on 11 September and then marched to New Ross, preparatory to moving north. However, the French expedition had already been defeated at the Battle of Ballinamuck, and the follow-up expedition was defeated at sea without landing. When the regiment reached Clonmel on 21 October the rebellion was effectively over. The regiment went into winter quarters but guard and picket duties heavy while the area was still in disorder.

With the end of the Irish Rebellion the government encouraged militiamen to volunteer for the regular army: the 1st RLM was one of a number of regiments that offered to serve abroad as a complete unit. However the legislation did not allow for this and the offer was declined, though Col Stanley encouraged his men to volunteer as individuals, and some 350 did so, over 150 joining the 20th Foot (later the Lancashire Fusiliers). Meanwhile, the trials of the rebels were continuing, and in May 1799 the militia brigade at Clonmel was put on alert to march at short notice in case of trouble, or of another French landing. In September, after a year's service in Ireland, the 1st RLM prepared to embark for England. Before departure one whole company, about 100 strong, recruited from Bolton and its neighbourhood, volunteered to transfer to the 36th Foot. The reduced regiment – about 560 other ranks (ORs) – embarked from Waterford on 9 October, landing at Bristol on 12 October. It rested at Tetbury and then on 21 October it began its march back to Lancashire. On arrival at Preston on 6 November the regiment was ordered to disembody.

The supplementary militia having been abolished, the remaining balloted men in Lancashire were distributed to the 1st, 2nd and 3rd RLM to fill vacancies – the officers of the 1st RLM complaining about the quality of the men they were assigned. The regiment completed disembodiment on 28 December 1799. It was called out again for training 5 August 1801, assembling at Lancaster (now its permanent HQ). A few days later it was informed that it would be embodied for active service again at the end of the training. On 26 September it began the march to its new station of Tynemouth Castle. On arrival, with the newly balloted men, it had a strength of 900 ORs. The Peace of Amiens was signed on 27 March 1802, and on 1 April the regiment was ordered to march back to Lancaster to disembody once more, apart from the small permanent staff.

=== Napoleonic Wars ===
The Peace of Amiens was short-lived, and the militia was called out again on 1 April 1803. After establishing a depot at Lancaster to train the newly balloted men the 1st RLM marched on 23 May to join the encampment at Danbury, Essex, under the command of Lt-Col John Plumbe, Col Stanley being unwell. The recruits followed from Lancaster on 20 July, bringing the regiment up to full strength of 1200 men in 12 companies. It remained at Danbury Camp until August 1804, when it was transferred to Brabourne Lees Camp in Kent, and then in June 1805 to Portsmouth. In August and September 1805, while Napoleon assembled an invasion force across the English Channel at Boulogne, the 1st RLM were camped at Weymouth, Dorset, where the royal family was in residence. Brigaded with the 1st and 2nd Somerset Militia and the North Yorkshire Militia, on 1 September the regiment had 873 men in 12 companies under Lt Col Edward Wilson.

In October moved to Exeter and the surrounding villages, where it spent the winter. In the spring it returned to Weymouth where it trained the newly balloted men, who replaced those time-expired and those who had volunteered for the regulars (one whole company had done so). It returned to Exeter for the winter of 1806, staying there and at Stonehouse Barracks, Plymouth, until May 1809. At that time it was ordered to Tavistock and then to Bristol, detaching 100 men to embark at Ilfracombe to sail to Milford Haven and Haverfordwest to reinforce the garrison there. The detachment rejoined HQ at Bristol in June, and the regiment stayed there until March 1811. During 1810 it had recruiting parties detached to Bolton, Manchester, Preston and Wigan. On 8 March 1811 the 1st RLM was ordered to march from Bristol to Hull; however on 25 March it was diverted en route to deal with Luddite disturbances that had broken out at Nottingham. It was ordered to resumed its march to Hull Barracks on 22 April. In October it was sent to Berwick-upon-Tweed and Tweedmouth, with detachments at Eyemouth and Holy Island. In March 1812 it moved into Scotland, to Dunbar and Haddington, and then to Dalkeith. It remained there, with occasional detachments to Penicuik where there was a large Prisoner-of-war camp to be guarded, until December 1814.

The militia had become one of the biggest sources of recruits to the regular army, and the 1st RLM was expected to supply a quota of 100 volunteers each year, rising to a draft or 244 men in February 1814. Colonel Plumbe also volunteered the whole regiment for service in Ireland, and roughly half the men agreed to extend their service accordingly. In March 1814 this body (12 officers and about 340 ORs) embarked at Portpatrick for Donaghadee, from where it marched to Belfast and then Athlone, arriving on 14 June. Napoleon had abdicated in April and peace was declared on 30 May, but the 1st RLM had still not been disembodied in February 1815 when he escaped from Elba and the war was resumed. The three regiments of Lancashire Militia, which happened to be stationed together at Dublin, were allowed to recruit back to full strength by ballot and 'by beat of drum'. They also provided drafts of around 1000 volunteers to the regular regiments being sent to Belgium. The 1st RLM supplied 23 NCOs and men to the 1st Foot Guards, and 11 each to the 33rd Foot and 71st (Highland) Light Infantry, with individuals to other regiments. There is a story that many of the Guardsmen at the Battle of Waterloo were still wearing their Militia uniforms.

Waterloo ended the war, but much of the regular army remained in France as part of the Army of Occupation for several months, and the Lancashire Militia continue their garrison duty at Dublin. The 1st RLM now being very weak, drafts of balloted men continued to be despatched from Lancaster until February 1816, when it was finally ordered to return for disembodiment. It embarked from Dublin on 25 March and landed at Liverpool, arriving at Lancaster on 5 April and being disembodied on 15 April.

=== Long peace ===
Militia training was suspended in most years after Waterloo, but the 1st RLM was called out for its 28 days' training in 1821, 1825 and 1831. Balloting continued, but the permanent staff of sergeants and drummers (who were occasionally used to maintain public order) was progressively reduced over the years. Just before the 1831 training King William IV bestowed on the three Lancashire Militia Regiments the additional title The Duke of Lancaster's Own. (Note: The monarch (of either sex) also being Duke of Lancaster.) No further militia training took place for the next 21 years. Although officers continued to be appointed to fill vacancies the ballot was suspended.

=== 1852 reforms ===
The Militia of the United Kingdom was revived by the Militia Act 1852, enacted during a period of international tension. As before, units were raised and administered on a county basis, and filled by voluntary enlistment (although conscription by means of the Militia Ballot might be used if the counties failed to meet their quotas). Training was for 56 days on enlistment, then for 21–28 days per year, during which the men received full army pay. Under the Act, Militia units could be embodied by Royal Proclamation for full-time service in three circumstances:

1. 'Whenever a state of war exists between Her Majesty and any foreign power'.
2. 'In all cases of invasion or upon imminent danger thereof'.
3. 'In all cases of rebellion or insurrection'.

In the case of the 1st RLM some younger officers were appointed, including John Talbot Clifton of Lytham Hall, formerly of the 1st Life Guards, as colonel, together with new permanent staff officers and regular army NCOs, and the revived regiment was called out for its first 21-day training on 8 November 1852. The staff NCOs and the few experienced officers had their hands full when the special trains brought the 500 undisciplined recruits from Bolton and Manchester, but had made good progress after three weeks' drilling on Giant Axe Field. The officers' mess now adopted the traditional Lancashire form of the Loyal toast: 'The Queen, Duke of Lancaster', which the regiment kept thereafter.

=== Crimean War ===
In May 1853, in view of the worsening international situation, the government ordered the lord lieutenant (the Earl of Sefton) to recruit the three Lancashire militia regiments up to their full strengths of 1200 each. The 1st RLM was called out for 28 day's annual training on 24 May, in which the staff were assisted by drill sergeants from the 50th Foot stationed nearby at Preston.

War having broken out with Russia in March 1854 and an expeditionary force sent to the Crimea, the Militia were called out for home defence. The 1st RLM assembled at Lancaster on 24 May for 28 days' training before embodiment. Colonel Clifton had already offered the regiment for overseas service – the first such offer made in this war by a militia regiment – and the government accepted a body of 500 men. On 16 June the regiment divided, 500 men for the service companies, the other 700 dismissed to their homes until further notice. The service battalion travelled by train to Deptford Dockyard, moving on 16 July to Portsmouth. In September, training began with the new Enfield rifled musket. In November there was a call to reinforce the army in the Crimea, and 250 men from the service companies of the 1st RLM volunteered. It was not until December that Parliament passed Acts allowing whole militia regiments to volunteer, and recalling out the men who had been disembodied in order to fill the vacancies.

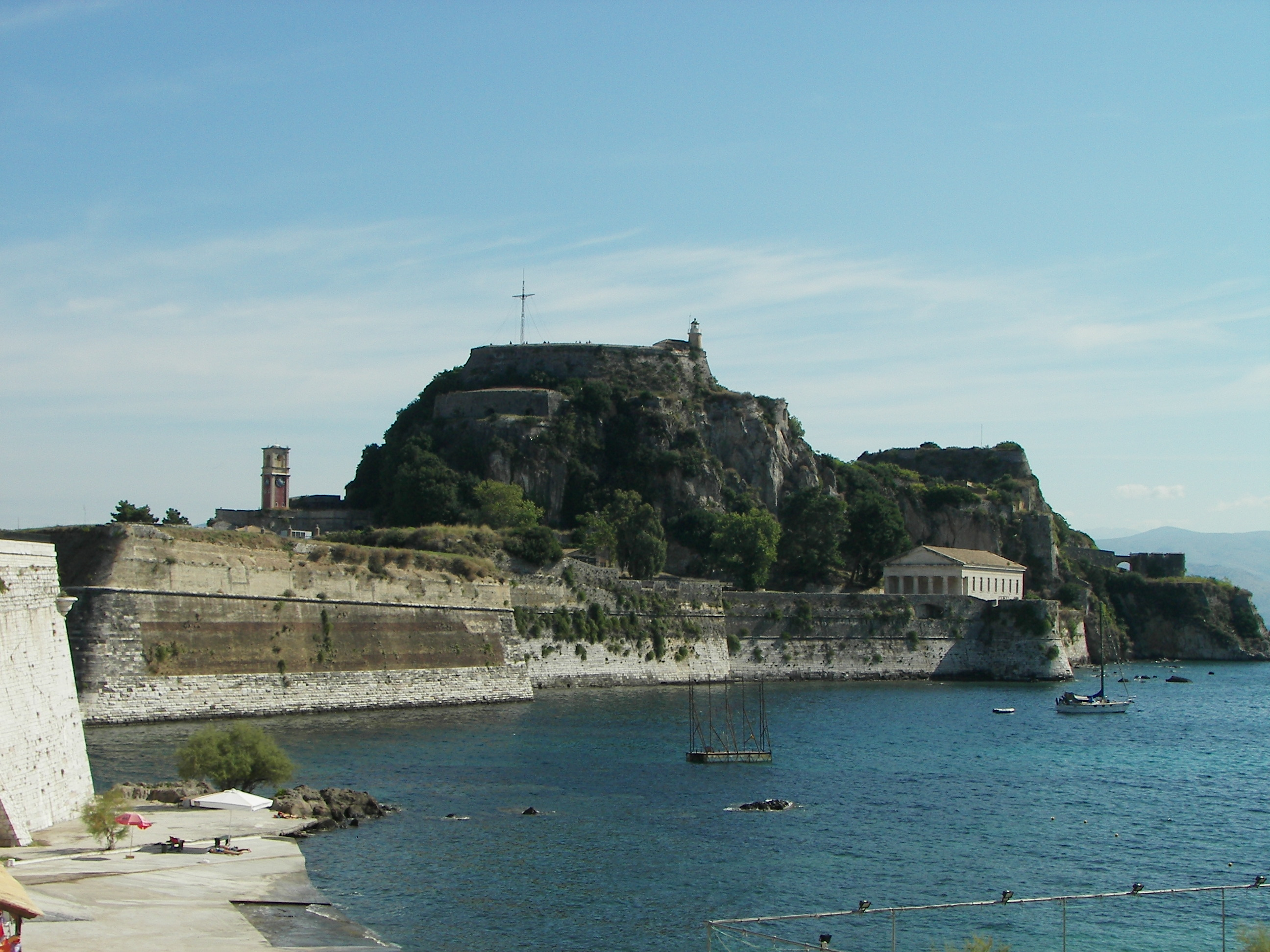
The Old Fortress at Corfu.

The regiment now prepared to embark for the Ionian Islands (then a British protectorate) to release the garrison to fight in the Crimea. The men who had not volunteered or were unfit for overseas service were formed into a regimental depot at Fort Cumberland, Portsmouth. The depot returned to Lancaster on 1 March 1855, and the service companies embarked on the transport Calcutta two days later. It sailed on 4 March and they disembarked at Corfu on 16 March, taking up quarters in the Citadel Barracks, with detachments on the islands of Fano, Paxo and Santa Maura. Its first task was to send the Grenadier Company on 20 March to suppress a riot on Vido among the convalescent soldiers from the Crimea. On 15 May the bulk of the regiment re-embarked for Zante, leaving detachments on Santa Maura, Cerigo and Cephalonia. In September there was a cholera outbreak at Zante, and in two weeks the regiment lost one officer, two NCOs and 275 men dead, and 54 invalided home. Two drafts of reinforcements arrived from the depot at Lancaster, 150 men on 25 November and 250 more on 15 January 1856. The Grenadier Company at Santa Maura had been unaffected by cholera, and was chosen to go to the Crimea to reinforce the army for its projected operations following the fall of Sevastopol in September 1855 (the only militia unit accepted). However, there were no further operations and the war ended on 30 March 1856 before the company had left the islands. The 1st RLM embarked on the troopship Colombo on 21 May, but its passage was delayed when the ship ran aground at Argostoli Bay, where it had gone to pick up the Grenadier Company. The ship was deemed to be overcrowded, and two companies were left at Malta to follow by a later steamer. The main body reached Portsmouth on 3 June, and went by trains to Lancaster on 8 and 9 June. The two companies from Malta were not disembodied until 16 July. After the regiment was disembodied it was awarded the Battle honour Mediterranean for its service.

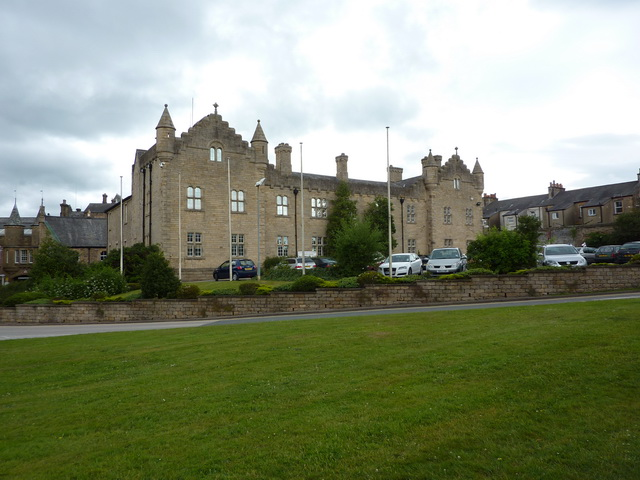
Springfield Barracks today.

Further militia regiments had been raised in Lancashire after 1852, bringing the total to seven of infantry and one of artillery. Each had its own recruiting areas across the county, those of the 1st RLM being Bolton (Great and Little), Fylde, Lancaster and Manchester. During the Crimean War the depot of the 1st RLM built a barracks on Windy Hill at Lancaster for 200 men and a storehouse with a parade ground for 800 men later known as Springfield Barracks. Plans to convert some old warehouses at St Georges Quay were scrapped when the war ended. Annual training for the 1st RLM resumed in 1857. It was usually held on Giant Axe Field, but at Ulverston when camp coincided with elections in Lancaster. In some years a joint field day was held with one of the Lancashire Rifle Volunteer Corps during annual training. From 1876 the regiment adopted the practice of camping at Scale Hall field, about 2 miles (3.2 km) from Lancaster, during its annual training.

=== Cardwell reforms ===
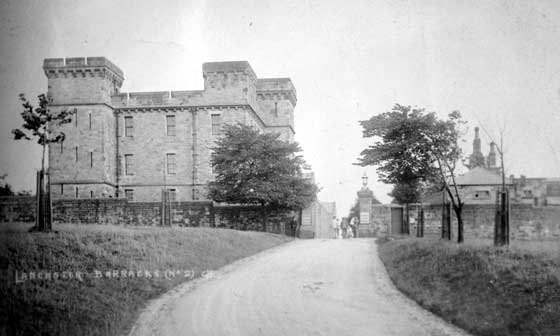
Bowerham Barracks

Under the 'Localisation of the Forces' scheme introduced by the Cardwell Reforms of 1872, Militia regiments were brigaded with their local regular and Volunteer battalions – for the 1st RLM this was with the 4th (King's Own) Regiment of Foot in Sub-District No 11 (County of Lancaster). The Militia now came under the War Office rather than their county lords lieutenant, and officers' commissions were signed by the Queen.

Although often referred to as brigades, the sub-districts were purely administrative organisations, but in a continuation of the Cardwell Reforms a mobilisation scheme began to appear in the Army List from December 1875. This assigned regular and militia units to places in an order of battle of corps, divisions and brigades for the 'Active Army', even though these formations were entirely theoretical, with no staff or services assigned. The 1st, 2nd and 3rd Royal Lancashire Militia formed 1st Brigade of 3rd Division, VI Corps. The brigade would have mustered at Manchester in time of war.

The Hon Frederick Stanley, MP, formerly captain in the Grenadier Guards, was appointed lieutenant-colonel commandant of the regiment (later of the 1st Battalion) on 23 June 1874, the rank of colonel in the militia having been abolished. He was also Financial Secretary to the War Office from 1874 to 1877, and Secretary of State for War 1878–80, which meant that he was often absent during training.

Cardwell's localisation scheme provided for the regular and militia regiments to be linked in pairs, sharing a single permanent depot. The 4th (King's Own) already had two battalions; the 1st RLM split to form its own second battalion on 26 September 1877, each being initially of six companies. A new regimental depot, Bowerham Barracks, was built at Lancaster between 1876 and 1880.

Militia battalions now had a large cadre of permanent staff (about 30). Around a third of the recruits and many young officers went on to join the regular army. (Note: Including the colonel's son Edward Stanley, future 17th Earl of Derby and Secretary of State for War, who obtained his first commission in the regiment before joining the Grenadier Guards.) In addition, the Militia Reserve introduced in 1867 consisted of present and former militiamen who undertook to serve overseas in case of war. During the international crisis caused by the Russo-Turkish War in 1877, the 1st RLM offered its service and was informed that it might be embodied for garrison duty. In the event the militia was not embodied, but the regular and militia reserves were called out the following year, those belonging to Sub-District No 11 assembling at Lancaster on 3 April. On 22 April they entrained to join the depot of the 4th (King's Own) at the Portsdown Hill Forts, where they served until 30 July when they were dismissed to heir homes.

== 3rd and 4th Battalions, King's Own (Royal Lancaster Regiment) ==
The Childers Reforms of 1881 took Cardwell's reforms further, with the linked regular and militia regiments becoming single county regiments. In the case of the Lancaster district this was the King's Own (Royal Lancaster Regiment) ('The King's Own') of four battalions: the 1st and 2nd were the regulars, while the 1st Royal Lancashire Militia (The Duke of Lancaster's Own) became the 3rd and 4th Bns, together with affiliated Volunteer Force battalions. As the regimental history put it, the 1st and 2nd Bns King's Own had amalgamated with the 1st and 2nd Bns Duke's Own. The two militia battalions continued to be administered as a single double-battalion regiment until 1 August 1900.

In 1882 the 3rd and 4th Battalions began their annual training at Lancaster on 3 July, but at the end of the month their training was extended for 56 days, embodying them for garrison duty during the crisis surrounding the Anglo-Egyptian War. Both battalions entrained for Preston on 31 July, and went to Fulwood Barracks, which were grossly overcrowded by the arrival of their 12 companies in addition to the reservists of the regular regiment stationed there. The two battalions returned to Lancaster on 26 August to be disembodied.

=== Second Boer War ===
After the disasters of Black Week at the start of the Second Boer War in December 1899, most of the regular army was sent to South Africa, and many militia units were embodied to replace them for home defence and to garrison certain overseas stations. The 4th Bn King's Own was embodied on 13 December 1899 and the 3rd Bn on 23 January 1900. Both battalions volunteered for overseas service.

The 4th Battalion left first, embarking with a strength of 25 officers and 666 ORs under the command of Lt-Col W. Kemmis and landing at Cape Town on 1 February 1900. It proceeded to the advanced base at Naauwpoort and was employed on the lines of communication with detachments guarding towns, bridges and culverts between Norvalspont and Port Elizabeth, Graaff-Reinet and Hanover Road. In August 1900 a column consisting of 200 men of the battalion and 40 of Nesbitt's Horse carried out a demonstration through the disaffected district of Hanover. On 30 December the Boers attacked and burned a train at the 'Gates of Hell' about 16 miles (26 km) from Naauwpoort: two companies of the battalion only arrived in time to exchange a few shots with the retiring enemy. In December, Lt-Col Kemmis was appointed commandant of Naauwpoort. On 23 February 1901 2nd Lt Hunt with 30 men guarding the Fish River bridge and station successfully held off Commandant Kritzinger and about 250 Boers for four hours before the armoured train came to their assistance and drove off the Boers. On 7 March Capt Worsley Taylor with 40 men of the 4th Bn and about 60 Mounted infantry (MI) was attacked by a superior force while repairing the Colesberg–Philippolis telegraph line. Taylor and his men took up a defensive position on a Kopje and held it for 24 hours until a relief column arrived from Colesberg. On 29 May Battalion HQ moved to Norvalspont and the battalion occupied the northern bank of the Orange River. Finally, it concentrated at De Aar on 5 July preparatory to embarking for home. During the campaign the battalion lost one officer and 21 ORs killed or died of disease. The 4th Bn was disembodied on 3 August 1901. It was awarded the battle honour South Africa 1900–01, and the officers and men received the Queen's South Africa Medal with the clasps 'Cape Colony', 'Orange Free State', and 'South Africa 1901'.

The 3rd Bn embarked for South Africa with a strength of 25 officers and 686 ORs under the command of Col B.N. North. It landed at Cape Town on 1 March 1900 and was deployed along the lines of communication in Orange River Colony, with Battalion HQ and three companies guarding the important railway bridge and supply depot at Zand River Bridge. They were attacked on 14 March by a Boer force that included artillery, driving them off after a day's fighting. The battalion also supplied an MI company that took part in the action at Ventersburg with a column under Col North operating with armoured trains. This force obliged the Boers to abandon their position at Zeegatacht, near Brandfort, on 16 January 1901, and North with the MI and armoured train drove them from Huten Beck on 28 January. At this time the rest of the battalion was holding the blockhouse line and railway from Kroonstad to Bloemfontein, driving off several attacks. In October 1901 the battalion was divided into several detachments that engaged Theron's Commando around Ceres. The battalion re-assembled on 10 January 1902 to embark for England, where it was disembodied on 8 February 1902. During the campaign the battalion had lost 51 ORs killed or died of disease. It was awarded the battle honour South Africa 1900–02, the Queen's South Africa Medal with the clasps 'Cape Colony' and 'Orange Free State', and the King's South Africa Medal with the clasps 'South Africa 1901' and 'South Africa 1902', and Lt-Col North was awarded a Companionship of the Order of the Bath (CB).

== Special Reserve ==
c. 1902 cap badge of the King's Own (Royal Lancaster Regiment)

After the Boer War, the future of the Militia was called into question. There were moves to reform the Auxiliary Forces (Militia, Yeomanry and Volunteers) to take their place in the six Army Corps proposed by the Secretary of State for War, St John Brodrick. However, little of Brodrick's scheme was carried out. Under the more sweeping Haldane Reforms of 1908, the militia was replaced by the Special Reserve, (SR) a semi-professional force whose role was to provide reinforcement drafts for Regular units serving overseas in wartime, rather like the earlier Militia Reserve. The 3rd Battalion became the 3rd (Reserve) Battalion, King's Own, on 19 July 1908, but the 4th Bn was disbanded on 31 August.

== World War I ==
=== 3rd (Reserve) Battalion ===
On the outbreak of war on 4 August 1914 the battalion was embodied at Lancaster under Lt-Col J.M.A. Graham, while the second-in-command, Maj H.P. Creagh-Osborne, commanded the regimental depot. It then moved to its war station at Saltash, Cornwall, for a few days before the bulk of the battalion moved to Sunderland. As well as forming part of the coastal defence garrison the battalion's role was to train and despatch drafts of reservists, special reservists, recruits and returning wounded for the regular battalions. The 1st King's Own served on the Western Front, while the 2nd Bn returned from India and after a few months on the Western Front spent the rest of the war on the Macedonian front. At first there was a flood of recruits, but by the spring and early summer of 1915 3rd Bn was so depleted by spinning off 10th Bn (see below) and by constant calls for reinforcement drafts for the Western Front that it was relieved from its garrison duties at Sunderland and returned to Stamford Heights above Plymouth and reunited with its HQ details. The 3rd Bn's band went on a recruiting drive round north-west Lancashire and the recruiting offices worked hard following the passing of the National Registration Act in July 1915 (the precursor to the Derby Scheme and eventually full conscription). Those enlisted went to 3rd or 10th Bn where they were given 18 weeks' training before being drafted to France. From 1915 to 1917 the 3rd Bn was at Plymouth under Lt-Col J Worsley-Taylor, but by November 1917 it had moved to Harwich. The battalion continued to serve, training thousands of recruits, beyond the end of the war. It was finally disembodied on 30 July 1919, when the remaining personnel were drafted to the 1st Bn.

=== 10th (Reserve) Battalion ===
After Lord Kitchener issued his call for volunteers in August 1914, the battalions of the 1st, 2nd and 3rd New Armies ('K1', 'K2' and 'K3' of 'Kitchener's Army') were quickly formed at the regimental depots. The SR battalions also swelled with new recruits and were soon well above their establishment strength. On 8 October 1914 each SR battalion was ordered to use the surplus to form a service battalion of the 4th New Army ('K4'). Accordingly, the 3rd (Reserve) Bn at Saltash formed the 10th (Service) Battalion of the King's Own on 22 October 1914, under the cokmmand of Lt-Col J.L. Bonomi. It moved to Kingsbridge in December 1914 and trained for active service as part of 99th Brigade in 33rd Division. On 10 April 1915 the War Office decided to convert the K4 battalions into 2nd Reserve units, to provide drafts for the K1–K3 battalions in the same way that the SR was doing for the Regular battalions. The King's Own battalion became 10th (Reserve) Battalion in 10th Reserve Brigade. The battalion moved to Swanage in Dorset in May and to Wareham in August 1915.

On 1 September 1916 the 2nd Reserve battalions were transferred to the Training Reserve (TR) and the battalion was redesignated 43rd Training Reserve Bn, still in 10th Reserve Bde at Wareham. The battalion was still commanded by Col Bonomi and the training staff retained their King's Own badges, while the other personnel were drafted to other battalions of the regiment. Thereafter the recruits joining the battalion wore a simple numeral badge until they were ready to be drafted. This could be to any regiment, but the 43rd TR Bn in 10th Reserve Bde was linked with the Worcestershire Regiment. The battalion was disbanded on 30 November 1917 at Perham Down Camp on Salisbury Plain.

=== Postwar ===
The SR resumed its old title of Militia in 1921 and then became the Supplementary Reserve in 1924, but like most militia battalions the 3rd King's Own remained in abeyance after World War I. By the outbreak of World War II in 1939, no officers remained listed for the battalion. (Note: However, the King's Own did have a number of Supplementary Reserve officers Class B attached to it.) The militia was formally disbanded in April 1953.

== Commanders ==
The following officers commanded the regiment as Colonel, as Honorary Colonel, or served as Lt-Col Commandant of one of its battalions: (Note: One source regards William Farrington, the King's Commissioner of Array in 1642, as the first Colonel of the Lancashire Militia.)

- William Stanley, 9th Earl of Derby appointed 1689
- Philip Hoghton, appointed 1 June 1715
- Edward Stanley, 11th Earl of Derby appointed 25 October 1745
- James Smith-Stanley, Lord Strange, appointed 15 July 1760, died 1 June 1771
- Edward Smith-Stanley, 12th Earl of Derby appointed 14 February 1772, resigned
- Thomas Stanley of Cross Hill, MP, appointed 28 October 1783, died 26 December 1816
- Peter Patten Bold, appointed 8 June 1817, died 1819
- John Plumbe-Tempest, promoted 4 November 1819, resigned 1852
- John Talbot Clifton, formerly 1st Life Guards, appointed 2 October 1852, resigned 1870
- William Assheton Cross, promoted 8 December 1870, appointed Hon Col 13 May 1871
- Robert Whitle, appointed 31 May 1872.
- Frederick Stanley, 16th Earl of Derby, KG, GCB, GCVO, Lt-Col Commandant, 1st Bn, 23 June 1874; appointed Hon Col 27 February 1886, died 14 June 1908
- Thomas Dawson Sheppard, Lt-Col Commandant, 2nd Bn, 26 September 1877
- George Blucher Heneage Marton, 20 March 1886, Lieutenant-Colonel Commandant, commanding 3rd Battalion.
- Joseph Lawson Whalley, 26 November 1887, commanding 4th Battalion
- B.N. North, CB, MVO, former Lt-Col Commandant, 3rd Bn, appointed Hon Col 19 July 1908
- J.M.A. Graham, DSO, commanding 3rd Bn from 11 May 1913
- J.Worsley-Taylor, promoted to command 3rd Bn from 25 August 1915
- Sir Thomas Dare Jackson, 2nd Baronet, DSO, MVO, commanding 3rd Bn from 7 August 1918

== Uniforms and insignia ==
The uniform of the Royal Lancashire Militia was red with the blue facings appropriate to 'Royal' regiments. The regimental colour presented in 1761 was blue and bore the coat of arms of the Duchy of Lancaster (on a shield gules, three lions of England (passant gardant) or, in chief a label azure of three points, each charged with three fleur-de-lis of France). The regimental colour presented by Queen Charlotte at Weymouth in 1806 simply carried the words 'FIRST ROYAL LANCASHIRE MILITIA' surrounded by a wreath of roses, thistles and shamrocks.

As a reward for its service in Ireland in 1798 the badge of the 'Harp and Crown' was bestowed on the regiment, and the 'Red Rose of Lancaster' in 1803. The set of colours believed to have been presented by the Lord Lieutenant of Ireland when the regiment was stationed in Dublin in 1816 bore the harp in the centre of the King's colour and the crowned red rose with 'LANCASTER' in Old English script in the three outer corners of the regimental colour. The colonel's wife, Mrs Clifton, presented new colours to the reformed regiment in 1853 and again in 1870 after the regulation size of colours was made smaller. The regimental colour bore a red rose inside a circle with the words 'DUKE OF LANCASTER'S OWN' surrounded by a wreath of roses, thistles and shamrocks. Above was a crown, below were the Roman numeral 'I' and two scrolls, the upper saying 'ROYAL LANCASHIRE MILITIA', the lower the battle honour 'MEDITERRANEAN'; the crown, numeral and upper scroll also appeared on the Queen's colour. The smaller 1870 colours were similar, but the numeral I had disappeared and the scroll now read '1. ROYAL LANCASHIRE MILITIA'. Lady Constance Stanley presented the 2nd Bn's colours in 1880: the design was the same, but the lettering on the scrolls was 'First Royal Lancashire Militia, 2nd Battalion, Mediterranean', which was repeated in black on a yellow ground in the centre of the Queens colour. (Note: As reported; however, the battle honour should have appeared on the regimental colour only.)

About 1790 the buttons had the letters 'RL' inside a crowned star; the figure '1' was added above the letters after the creation of the 2nd RLM, and these buttons were retained until 1829. The officers' shako plate in 1812–16 consisted of the stylised cipher 'GR' above an enamelled red rose, with a silver spray of leaves beneath and the numeral '1' at the bottom, the whole plate a highly stylised escutcheon topped with a crown. The ORs' plate was plain brass, the word 'LANCASTER" appearing between the cipher and rose, and no numeral at the bottom. The cap badge of 1852 was circular, with 'LANCASTER' in Old English lettering above a red rose, a spray of leaves below; the officer's belt plate carried this badge without the spray of leaves but surmounted by a crown, on a decorated star. The OR's Glengarry badge of 1874–81 had the royal crest (a crowned lion statant gardant on a crown) over the red rose within a spray of grass, with a scroll underneath inscribed 'THE DUKE OF LANCASTER'S OWN'.

In 1881 the regiment combined the insignia of the King's Own and the Duke's Own, with the Red Rose of Lancaster surmounted by the Lion of England. Later this was replaced by the lion over the words 'KING'S OWN'.

== Precedence ==
In September 1759 it was ordered that militia regiments on service were to take their relative precedence from the date of their arrival in camp. In 1760 this was altered to a system of drawing lots where regiments did duty together. During the War of American Independence all the counties were given an order of precedence determined by ballot each year, beginning in 1778. For the Lancashire Militia the positions were:

- 38th on 1 June 1778
- 43rd on 12 May 1779
- 30th on 6 May 1780
- 12th on 28 April 1781
- 32nd on 7 May 1782

The militia order of precedence balloted for in 1793 (when Lancashire was 37th) remained in force throughout the French Revolutionary War: this covered all the regiments formed in the county. Another ballot for precedence took place at the start of the Napoleonic War, when Lancashire was 52nd. This order continued until 1833. In that year the King drew the lots for individual regiments and the resulting list remained in force with minor amendments until the end of the militia. The regiments raised before the peace of 1763 took the first 47 places: the 1st RLM was 45th. Formally, the regiment became the 45th, or 1st Royal Lancashire Militia, but the 1st RLM like most regiments seems to have paid little attention to the additional number.

== See also ==
- Militia (English)
- Militia (Great Britain)
- Militia (United Kingdom)
- Special Reserve
- Lancashire Militia
- King's Own Royal Regiment (Lancaster)
