= Liverpool Blues =

Liverpool Blues may refer to the following British Army regiments:

- Liverpool Blues (Regiment), 1745–46
- 79th Regiment of Foot (Royal Liverpool Volunteers), 1778–84
