= Lancaster Corporation Tramways =

Tramway in Lancashire, England

Operation
- Locale: Lancaster
- Open: 14 January 1903
- Close: 4 April 1930
- Status: Closed

Infrastructure
- Track gauge: 4 ft 8 1/2 in (1,435 mm) standard gauge
- Propulsion system: Electric
- Electrification: (?)

Statistics
- Route length: 2.99 miles (4.81 km)

Lancaster Corporation Tramways operated a tramway service over 2.99 miles of track in the city of Lancaster and its suburbs, opening in 1903 and closing in 1930 after financial difficulties from opening, and increasing competition from motorised buses. The trams ran from Scotforth and Bowerham through the city centre, with a branch to the London and North Western railway station (then named) Lancaster Castle railway station.

== History ==
Proposals were brought to Lancaster Borough Council to build a private tramway for the city, the councillors (after rejecting that proposal) were motivated to construct their own tramway to serve the-then-borough of Lancaster (Lancaster only became a city in 1937). They authorised the construction with the Lancaster Corporation Act of 1900, and the electric tramway opened to the public on the 14 January 1903.

From opening, the tramway was operated by ten open-top double deck cars supplied by the Lancaster Railway Carriage and Wagon Company, which were supplemented by two more cars from Milnes Voss when the branch to the LNWR's railway station (Lancaster Castle railway station) opened late in 1904.

Other plans existed to extend the tracks in various directions surrounding Lancaster, but none of these were ever enacted due to the persistent financial difficulties faced by the corporation through its existence.

=== Decline ===
The branch to Lancaster Castle railway station closed on 10 July 1920 after the poor condition of the tracks post-WW1 were discovered. Over the next ten years, the corporation operated more numerous services to new locations using newly purchased motorised buses. By 1928, the council was discussing abandoning the tramway altogether, and over the next two years, services were degraded and run down. The tramway closed after the last tram ran on 4 April 1930. The depot buildings on King Street survived as student accommodation and are now known as Victoria Court.
