= Archibald Hamilton, 9th Duke of Hamilton =

British politician (1740–1819

His Grace The Duke of Hamilton
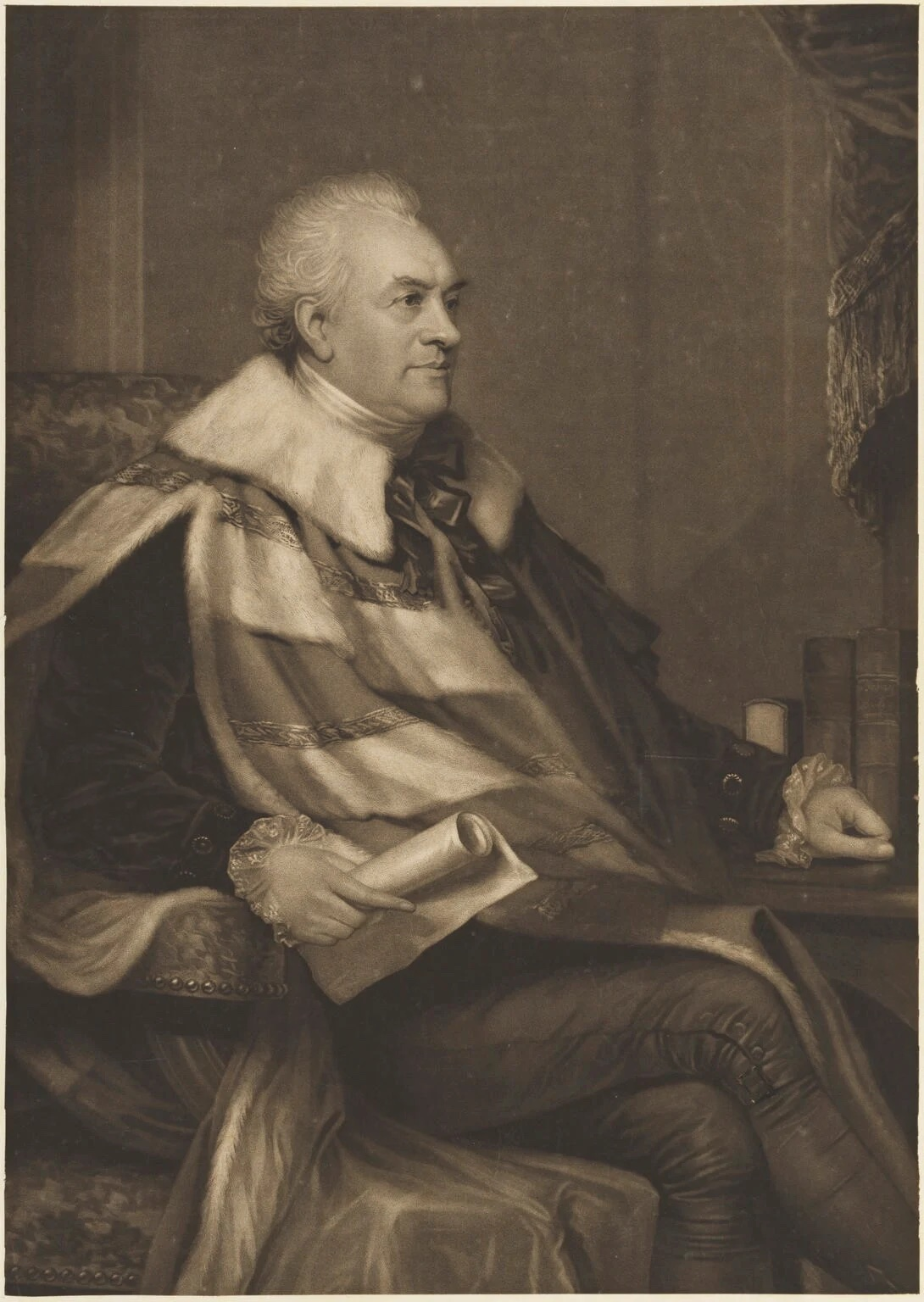

Member of Parliament for Lancashire
- In office 1768–1772
- Preceded by: Lord Strange and James Shuttleworth
- Succeeded by: The Earl of Sefton and Sir Thomas Egerton

Personal details
- Born: 15 July 1740
- Died: 16 February 1819 (aged 78)
- Spouse: Lady Harriet Stewart
- Children: Anne, Alexander, Archibald, Charlotte, Susan
- Parents: James Hamilton, 5th Duke of Hamilton (father); Anne Hamilton (mother)

Archibald Hamilton, 9th Duke of Hamilton and 6th Duke of Brandon (15 July 1740 – 16 February 1819) was a British politician who represented Lancashire in the House of Commons of Great Britain from 1768 to 1772.

== Background and education ==
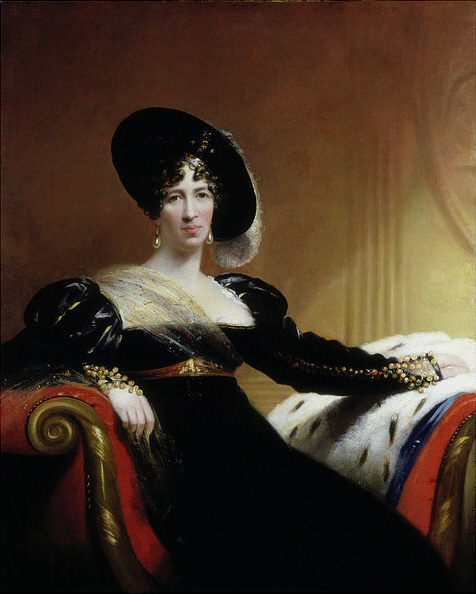
Lady Anne Hamilton in 1815

Hamilton was the second son of the 5th Duke of Hamilton, by his third wife, Anne Spencer, and was educated at Eton. He was uncle to Douglas Hamilton, 8th Duke of Hamilton who died without legitimate issue.

== Political career ==
In 1768, Hamilton became member of parliament for Lancashire and held the seat until 1772 when he was appointed a Steward of the Chiltern Hundreds. In 1799, he inherited his half-nephew's titles and was appointed his successor as Lord Lieutenant of Lanarkshire.

== Horse racing ==
Hamilton was a prominent figure in the world of Thoroughbred horse racing. Between 1786 and 1814 his horses won seven runnings of the St Leger Stakes at Doncaster.

== Family ==
On 25 May 1765, he married Lady Harriet Stewart (a daughter of the 6th Earl of Galloway) and they had five children:

- Lady Anne (1766–1846), lady-in-waiting to Queen Caroline, died unmarried (see also Olivia Serres)
- Alexander Hamilton, 10th Duke of Hamilton (1767–1852)
- Lord Archibald Hamilton (1769–1827)
- Lady Charlotte (1772–1827), married the 11th Duke of Somerset
- Lady Susan (1774–1846), married the 5th Earl of Dunmore

The duke died in 1819 and was succeeded by his eldest son.

Archibald Hamilton, 9th Duke of Hamilton House of Douglas and Angus Born: 15 July 1740 Died: 16 February 1819
Parliament of Great Britain
Preceded by Lord Strange; James Shuttleworth	Member of Parliament for Lancashire; 1768–1772; With: Lord Strange 1768–71; The Earl of Sefton 1771–74	Succeeded by The Earl of Sefton; Sir Thomas Egerton
Honorary titles
Preceded by The Duke of Hamilton	Lord Lieutenant of Lanarkshire; 1799–1802	Succeeded by Marquess of Douglas
Peerage of Scotland
Preceded by Douglas Hamilton	Duke of Hamilton; 1799–1819	Succeeded by Alexander Hamilton
Peerage of Great Britain
Preceded by Douglas Hamilton	Duke of Brandon; 1799–1819	Succeeded by Alexander Hamilton
Preceded by Douglas Hamilton	Baron Dutton (descended by acceleration); 1799–1806	Succeeded by Alexander Hamilton
