= Thomas Stanley (Lancashire MP, born 1753) =

Thomas Smith-Stanley (c. 1753 – late 1779) was a British Army officer and politician who sat in the House of Commons from 1776 to 1779.

Stanley was the son of James Smith-Stanley, Lord Strange. He was educated at Eton College and Trinity College, Cambridge. He joined the army as a cornet in the 16th Light Dragoons in 1775, was promoted captain in the 17th Light Dragoons in 1776 and made major in the 79th Regiment of Foot (Royal Liverpool Volunteers) in 1777.

Stanley was returned unopposed as Member of Parliament (MP) for Lancashire at a by-election on 26 March 1776. He went with his regiment to Jamaica in 1779, and died toward the end of that year.

Parliament of Great Britain
| Preceded by Lord Stanley; Sir Thomas Egerton | Member of Parliament for Lancashire; 1776–1779; With: Sir Thomas Egerton | Succeeded by Thomas Stanley; Sir Thomas Egerton |
