= James Smith-Stanley, Lord Strange =

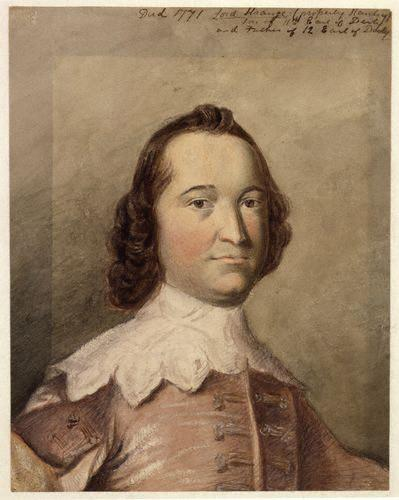
- Lord Strange, c. 1749

Member of Parliament for Lancashire
- In office 1741–1771 Serving with Richard Shuttleworth (1741–1750), Peter Bold (1750–1761), James Shuttleworth (1761–1768), Lord Archibald Hamilton (1768–1771)

Chancellor of the Duchy of Lancaster
- In office 1762–1771
- Preceded by: The Earl of Kinnoull
- Succeeded by: The Earl of Clarendon

Lord Lieutenant of Lancashire
- In office 1757–1771
- Preceded by: The Earl of Derby
- Succeeded by: The Earl of Derby

Personal details
- Born: 1716
- Died: 1771 (aged 54–55)
- Spouse: Lucy Smith
- Children: Edward Smith-Stanley, 12th Earl of Derby, Thomas Stanley (1753–1779), and others
- Parent: Edward Stanley, 11th Earl of Derby (father)

Military service
- Allegiance: Kingdom of Great Britain
- Branch/service: Lancashire Militia
- Rank: Colonel

James Smith-Stanley, Lord Strange (1716 – 1771) was commonly known by that courtesy title, although neither he nor his father had any claim to it as a parliamentary peerage. He was the eldest son of Edward Stanley, 11th Earl of Derby, whose predecessors had held that peerage, but after the death of the 10th Earl the right to two Strange baronies (both baronies by writ) had descended to daughters, while the earldom had passed to an heir male.

Stanley's Name Act 1747
- Act of Parliament
- Parliament of Great Britain
- Long title: An Act to enable James Stanley Esquire, commonly called Lord Strange, Eldest Son and Heir Apparent of Edward Earl of Derby, and his Issue by Lucy his Wife (late Lucy Smith), to take and use the Surname of Smith, and bear the Arms of Smith and Hertz.
- Citation: 21 Geo. 2. c. 4 Pr.
- Territorial extent: Great Britain

Dates
- Royal assent: 25 March 1748
- Commencement: 10 November 1747 (Note: Start of session.)

Status: Current legislation

James Stanley married Lucy daughter and coheiress of Hugh Smith of Weald Hall, Essex; on his marriage, he took by a private act of Parliament the additional surname of Smith. Stanley's Name Act 1747 (21 Geo. 2. c. 4 Pr.) They were the parents of Edward Smith-Stanley, 12th Earl of Derby, and several other children, including Thomas Stanley. He died before his father, so that the earldom later went to his eldest son.

He attended Westminster School where he became a close friend of the future soldier, playwright, and politician John Burgoyne, who was to surrender his army at Saratoga in 1777. As a young man, Burgoyne eloped with Lord Strange's sister. Burgoyne also wrote a masque to celebrate the wedding of Edward Smith-Stanley to Lady Elizabeth Hamilton, a daughter of James Hamilton, 6th Duke of Hamilton.

== Public service ==
Lord Strange was a Member of Parliament for Lancashire from 1741 until his death. He was Chancellor of the Duchy of Lancaster in the ministry of Lord North from 1762 and became a Privy Councillor at the same time.

As Lord Lieutenant of Lancashire during the Seven Years' War, he was tasked with calling out the Lancashire Militia, which had been disembodied since 1746. Although Lancashire's quota was only a single regiment, and despite Strange's enthusiasm, it was not until July 1760 that the regiment got up to six-tenths of its establishment and was issued with arms. Strange was then commissioned as its Colonel (15 July 1760). The regiment was finally embodied for full-tine service on 23 December that year. In October 1761, King George III presented the Regimental Colours and granted the unit the title 'Royal Lancashire Militia', the colonel's own company becoming 'the King's Company'. The regiment was disembodied in December 1762, as the war was coming to an end, but Strange remained its colonel for the rest of his life.

He is mentioned by Parkman as plenipotentiary to Paris and Choiseul, and advisor to Pitt, during the 1760s turbulence that attended the Treaty of Paris (1763).

== Ancestry ==
Ancestors of James Smith-Stanley, Lord Strange

16. Thomas Stanley of Bickerstaffe
8. Edward Stanley
17. Mary Egerton
4. Sir Thomas Stanley, 4th Baronet
18. Francis Wyatt
9. Elizabeth Wyatt
19. Margaret Sandys
2. Edward Stanley, 11th Earl of Derby
10. Thomas Patten of Preston
5. Elizabeth Patten
1. James Smith-Stanley
24. Robert Hesketh of Rufford
12. Thomas Hesketh
25. Lucy Rigby
6. Robert Hesketh
26. Sir Richard Grosvenor, 2nd Baronet
13. Sydney Grovesnor
27. Sidney Mostyn
3. Elizabeth Hesketh
28. William Spencer, 2nd Baron Spencer of Wormleighton
14. William Spencer of Ashton
29. Penelope of Wriothesley
7. Elizabeth Spencer
30. Dutton Gerard
15. Elizabeth Gerard
31. Elizabeth O'Brien

== Notes ==
Parliament of Great Britain
Preceded by Peter Bold; Richard Shuttleworth	Member of Parliament for Lancashire; 1741–1771; With: Richard Shuttleworth 1741–1750; Peter Bold 1750–1761; James Shuttleworth 1761–1768; Lord Archibald Hamilton 1768–1771	Succeeded by The Earl of Sefton; Lord Archibald Hamilton
Political offices
Preceded by The Earl of Kinnoull	Chancellor of the Duchy of Lancaster; 1762–1771	Succeeded by The Earl of Clarendon
Honorary titles
Preceded by The Earl of Derby	Lord Lieutenant of Lancashire; 1757–1771	Succeeded by The Earl of Derby
