= Royal Liverpool =

Royal Liverpool may refer to:

- Royal Liverpool Golf Club, Hoylake
- Royal Liverpool Philharmonic
- Royal Liverpool University Hospital
- 79th Regiment of Foot (Royal Liverpool Volunteers)
