= Springfield Barracks =

Barracks in Lancaster, Lancashire, England

- Lancaster
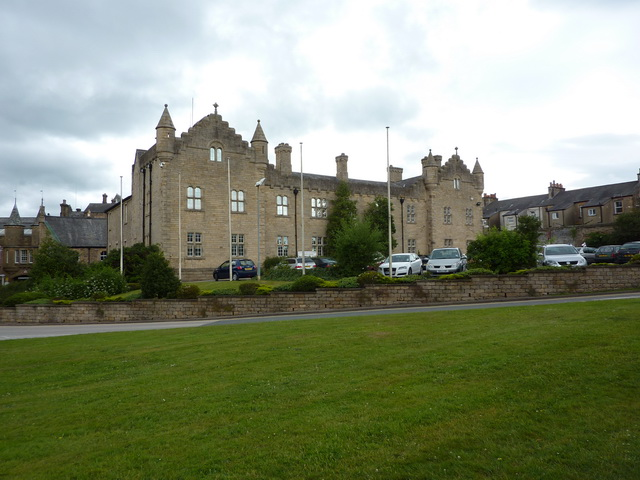
- Springfield Barracks

Site information
- Type: Barracks

Location
- Location within Lancashire
- Coordinates: 54.0444°N 2.7981°W

Site history
- Built: 1854
- Built for: War Office
- In use: 1854-1983

Listed Building – Grade II
- Designated: 18 February 1970
- Reference no.: 1298329

Springfield Barracks is a former military installation in east side of South Road in Lancaster, England. It is a Grade II listed building.

== History ==
The building, which was designed by Edmund Sharpe (after he had handed over his practice to Paley and Austin) in the Scottish baronial style for the 1st Royal Lancashire Militia (The Duke of Lancaster's Own), was completed in 1854. It was named after Springfield Hall which was located on the west side of South Road and which formed the basis of the Royal Lancaster Infirmary site. The militia moved to larger premises at Bowerham Barracks in around 1883 and the building was subsequently used as a drill hall by artillery units. It was acquired by Storey Brothers & Co., makers of printed sheeting and coated fabric, who converted it for use as offices for White Cross Mills, in 1983.
