= Peter Bold =

Peter Bold (c.1705–1762) of Bold Hall in Prescot, Lancashire, was a British landowner and Tory politician who sat in the House of Commons between 1727 and 1761.

== Biography ==
Bold was the eldest son of Richard Bold, MP, and his wife Elizabeth Norton, daughter of Thomas Norton of Barkisland, Yorkshire. In 1704 as an infant, he succeeded to his father’s estates. He matriculated at Brasenose College, Oxford on 2 February 1722, aged 16. He married Anna Maria Sylvester, widow of Rev. Edward Sylvester of Barthwaite and daughter of Godfrey Wentworth of Woolley Park, Yorkshire. Bold was responsible for the building of Bold Hall in about 1732. It was designed and erected under the supervision of the Italian architect Giacomo Leoni and was a very substantial and uniform edifice, with fine stone columns and corresponding decorative dressings.

At the 1727 British general election Bold was returned unopposed as Tory Member of Parliament for Wigan under an agreement made with Lord Barrymore. He did not stand at the 1734 British general election. He was returned unopposed as MP for Lancashire at a by-election on 4 May 1736 when Sir Edward Stanley went to the House of Lords. He withdrew at the 1741 British general election when Lord Strange threatened a contest. He stood unsuccessfully for Lancashire at the 1747 British general election and was returned there unopposed at a by-election on 23 January 1750.

Bold was returned unopposed for Lancashire at the 1754 British general election. He did not stand again in 1761.

Bold died on 12 September 1762. He and his wife had six daughters. The eldest, Anna Maria, succeeded to Bold Hall and his other estates, and died unmarried in 1813, aged eighty-one. Another daughter Dorothea married Thomas Patten of Bank Hall, Warrington and their son Peter Patten inherited Bold Hall from his aunt in 1813. The Hall was demolished at the end of the 19th century and Old Bold Hall which preceded it was demolished in 1936.

Parliament of Great Britain
Preceded by Sir Roger Bradshaigh; The Earl of Barrymore	Member of Parliament for Wigan; 1727–1734; With: Sir Roger Bradshaigh	Succeeded by Sir Roger Bradshaigh; The Earl of Barrymore
Preceded by Sir Edward Stanley; Richard Shuttleworth	Member of Parliament for Lancashire; 1736–1741; With: Richard Shuttleworth	Succeeded by Lord Strange; Richard Shuttleworth
Preceded by Lord Strange; Richard Shuttleworth	Member of Parliament for Lancashire; 1750–1761; With: Lord Strange	Succeeded by Lord Strange; James Shuttleworth
