= Thomas Stanley (Lancashire MP, born 1749) =

British politician

Member of Parliament for Lancashire
- In office February 1780 – 1812 Serving with Thomas Egerton, 1st Earl of Wilton (1780–1784), John Blackburne (1784–1812)

Personal details
- Born: 14 September 1749
- Died: 25 December 1816 (aged 67)
- Party: Whig
- Education: Manchester Grammar School, Trinity Hall, Cambridge
- Profession: Politician, Book collector, Militia Colonel

Colonel Thomas Stanley (14 September 1749 – 25 December 1816) was a British Whig politician who sat in the House of Commons for 32 years from 1780 to 1812. He also served as Colonel of the 1st Royal Lancashire Militia.

He was the son of the Revd Thomas Stanley and educated at Manchester Grammar School and Trinity Hall, Cambridge. He was described as being of Cross Hall, Lathom near Ormskirk Lancashire.

He was a member of parliament (MP) for Lancashire from February 1780 until he retired from the House of Commons at the 1812 general election, having been elected unopposed at seven successive elections. In his long parliamentary career he spoke often in favour of the Lancashire cotton industry.

Colonel Stanley was also an avid book collector, with a focus on Literature and Fine Binding. As reported by T. F. Dibdin in his "Bibliographical Decameron" (1817, volume iii, pp. 78–82), the Stanley Sale of 1813 (Bibliotheca Stanleiana) was a major event among bibliomaniacs, and was one of the most impressive libraries ever to be sold during the lifetime of the owner. Apparently, Stanley used the proceeds from the sale to retire in style.

He died 3 years after the sale, unmarried, aged 67.

Parliament of Great Britain
Preceded by Thomas Stanley; Thomas Egerton	Member of Parliament for Lancashire; 1780 – 1800; With: Thomas Egerton to 1784; John Blackburne from 1784	Succeeded by Parliament of the United Kingdom
Parliament of the United Kingdom
Preceded by Parliament of Great Britain	Member of Parliament for Lancashire; 1801 – 1812; With: John Blackburne	Succeeded by Lord Stanley; John Blackburne
