= James Shuttleworth (politician) =

English Member of Parliament and High Sheriff of Yorkshire

Member of Parliament for Lancashire
- In office 1761–1768 Serving with Lord Strange
- Preceded by: Lord Strange; Peter Bold
- Succeeded by: Lord Strange; Lord Archibald Hamilton

Personal details
- Born: 1714
- Died: 28 June 1773 (aged 58–59)
- Spouse: Mary Holden (m. 1742; died 1773)
- Children: 7
- Parent(s): Richard Shuttleworth; Emma Tempest

James Shuttleworth (1714 – 28 June 1773) was an English Member of Parliament and High Sheriff of Yorkshire.

== Early life ==
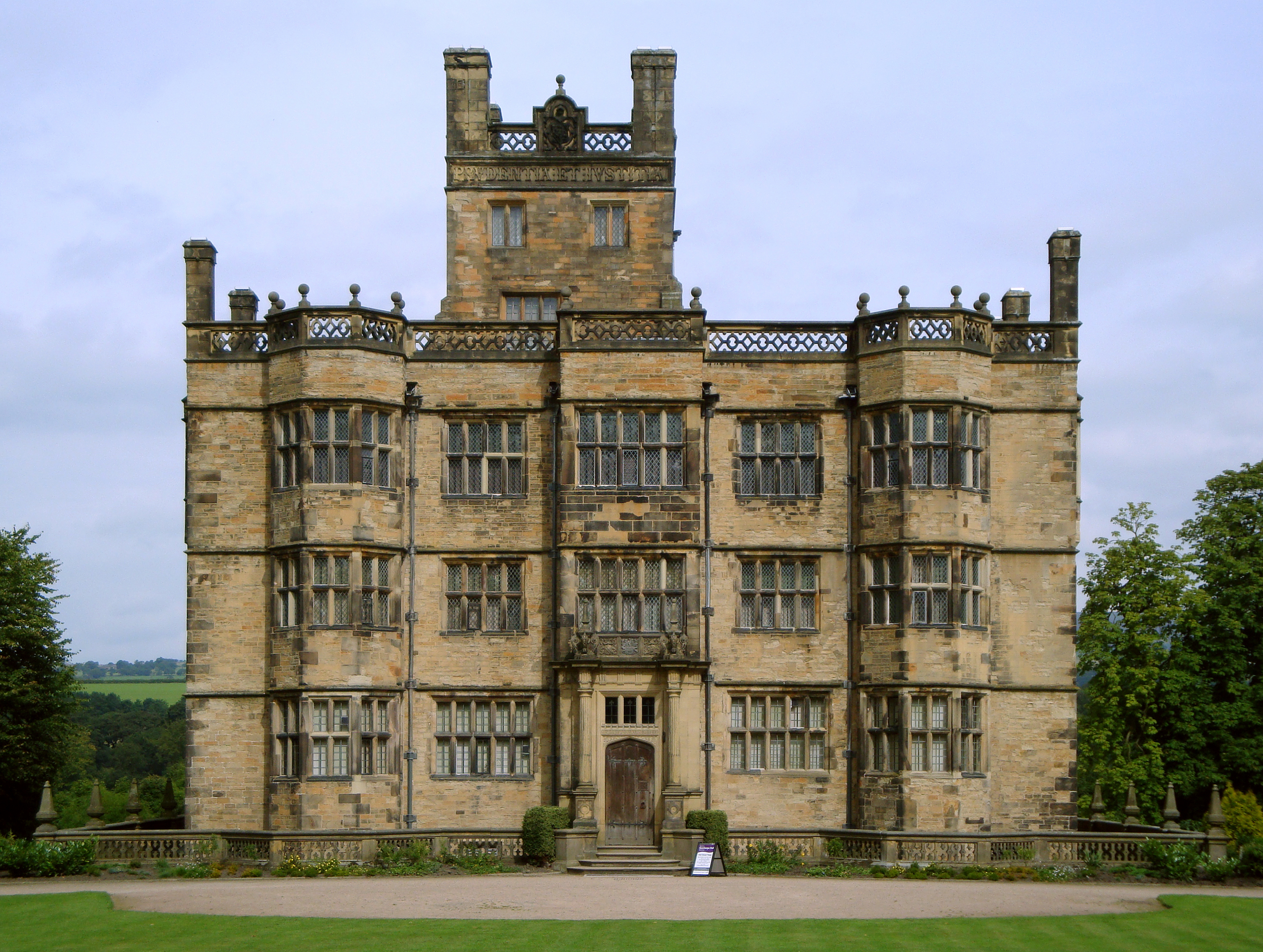
Gawthorpe Hall

He was born the eldest surviving son of Emma Tempest (the daughter of William Tempest of Old Durham) and Richard Shuttleworth of Gawthorpe Hall, Padiham, Lancashire and Forcett Hall, Yorkshire. He succeeded his father in 1769, inheriting both the Gawthorpe and Forcett estates and, like his father, chose to live at the latter.

== Career ==
He was elected MP for Preston in 1741, holding the seat until 1754. He was appointed High Sheriff of Yorkshire for 1760–61 and elected MP for Lancashire in 1761, sitting until 1768.

== Personal life ==
On 25 May 1742, Shuttleworth married Mary Holden (1716–1791), the daughter and heiress of Robert Holden of Aston Hall, Derbyshire. Together, they were the parents of four sons and three daughters, including:

- Robert Shuttleworth (1745–1816), a Fellow of the Royal Society; he married Anne Desaguliers, a daughter of Thomas Desaguliers, in 1776.
- James Shuttleworth, who changed his surname to Holden in line with the will of his grandfather, Robert Holden, in order to inherit his estate, including Aston Hall.
- William Shuttleworth (1749–1791) who also changed his surname; he sailed with Captain James Cook on his third voyage in 1776.
- Rev. Charles Edward Shuttleworth (b. 1749), who also changed his surname; he married Rosamond Amelia Deane in 1796.
- Mary Shuttleworth (1750–1786), who married Sir Charles Turner, 1st Baronet, MP for York, in 1771. After his death in 1783, she married Sir Thomas Gascoigne, 8th Baronet, MP for Thirsk, in 1784.

He died in 1773 and was buried at Forcett Church. He was succeeded by his eldest son Robert.

Parliament of Great Britain
Preceded by Lord Strange; Peter Bold	Member of Parliament for Lancashire; 1761 – 1768; With: Lord Strange	Succeeded by Lord Strange; Lord Archibald Hamilton
