= Richard Shuttleworth (MP for Lancashire) =

English Tory politician

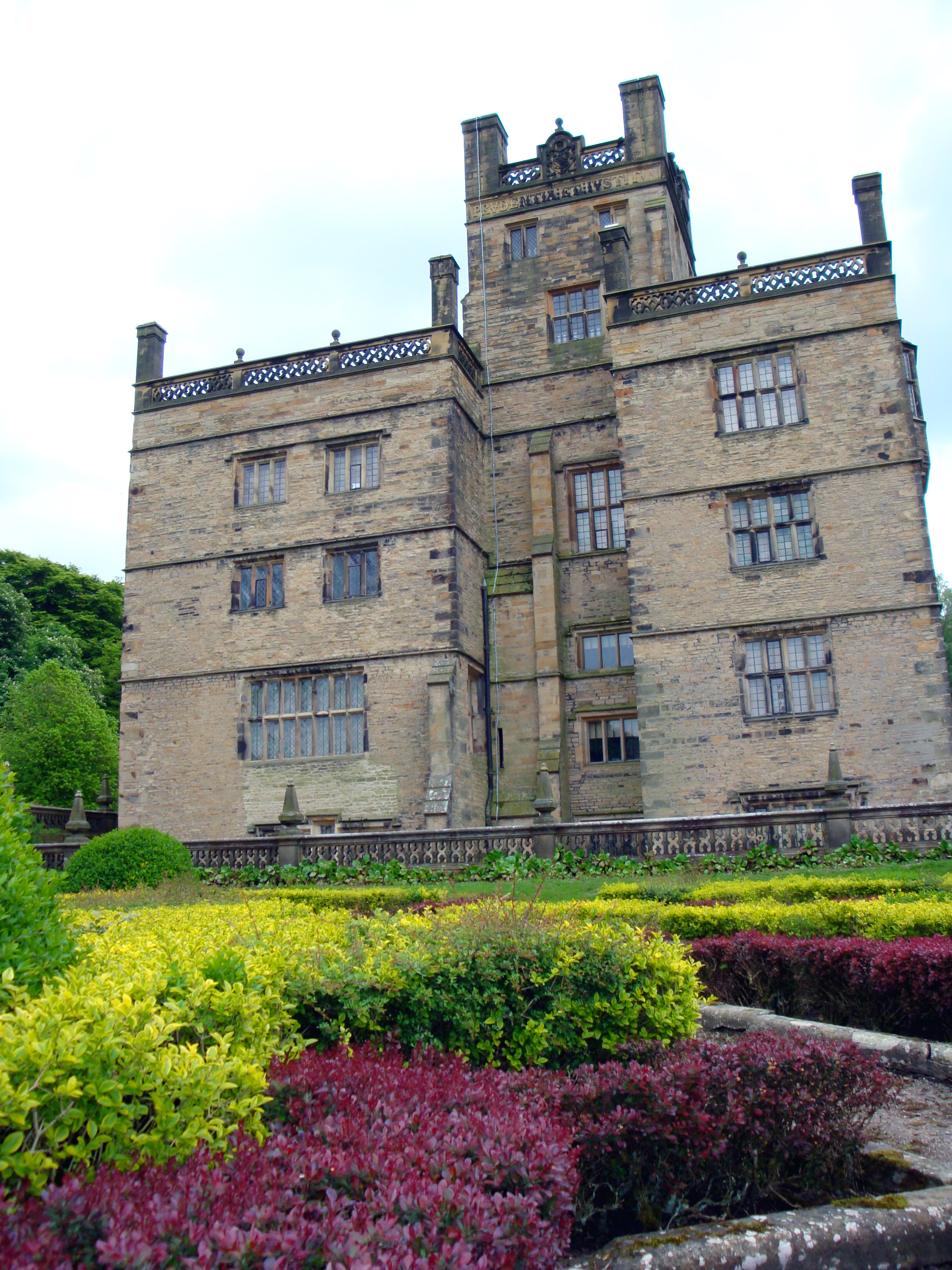
- The rear of Gawthorpe Hall, with a portion of the rear gardens

Member of Parliament for Lancashire
- In office 1705–1749

Personal details
- Born: 1683
- Died: 22 December 1749 (aged 65–66)
- Party: Tory
- Children: 5 sons, 3 daughters, including James Shuttleworth

Richard Shuttleworth (1683–22 December 1749) of Gawthorpe Hall, Lancashire and Forcett Hall, Yorkshire was an English Tory politician who sat in the English and British House of Commons for 44 years from 1705 to 1749. He was considered Whimsical as he occasionally failed to support his party.

== Early life ==
Shuttleworth was baptized on 3 September 1683, the eldest son of Sir Richard Shuttleworth, of Gawthorpe Hall and Forcett, and his wife Katherine Clerke, daughter of Henry Clerke. He succeeded his father in 1687. From 1703 to 1704, he travelled abroad in France and Italy. He married Emma Tempest, the daughter of William Tempest of Old Durham.

== Career ==
Shuttleworth was elected as a Tory Member of Parliament for Lancashire in a contest at the 1705 general election. He was active in parliament, particularly on local issues. He voted on against the Court candidate for Speaker on 25 October 1705 and told against the Administration in various divisions. A concern of the Lancashire weavers was the extent of frauds in the working up of cloth and iron, and he was appointed to help draft a bill to prevent such frauds. In January 1707 he guided this bill through the Commons, and took it to the Lords on 18 February. His exertions were much appreciated in Lancashire, but the Bill was twice lost through the prorogation of Parliament. He was returned unopposed at the 1708 British general election, and continued his concern for local interests by his appointment, on 7 February 1709, to draft a bill to create a new parish at Manchester, and by telling for the Liverpool dock bill on 18 March 1710. Otherwise he made little recorded contribution but voted in 1710 against the impeachment of Dr Sacheverell. At the 1710 he was returned again and told for the Tories in an election dispute and was a member of the October Club. However he left the October Club, and went over to the splinter March Club. The March club sometimes supported the Administration, opposing moves proposed by the October Club. Like other members of the March Club, he opposed the terms of the commercial treaty. He told against the second reading of the bill to suspend duties on French wine on 6 May and voted against the French commerce bill on 18 June 1713. He was returned unopposed at the 1713 and continued to act in a "Whimsical" manner while notionally supporting the Tory party.

Shuttleworth was returned unopposed again at the 1715 British general election, and was listed as a Tory who sometimes voted with the Whigs. He was one of the few Tory justices left on the Lancashire bench following the regulation of 1715. In 1722 he faced a contest at Lancashire, which he won, and was returned unopposed again in 1727, 1734 and 1741. He generally voted against the Administration, and his only recorded speech was on the gin bill in 1736. He was Father of the House from 1748.

== Later life and legacy ==
As a result of a fire in 1726, Forcett Hall was substantially redesigned in 1740 in the Palladian style by architect Daniel Garrett. Shuttleworth and his family moved into Forcett Hall and leased Gawthorpe Hall. Shuttleworth died on 22 December 1749. He had five sons and three daughters. His son and heir James Shuttleworth also became MP for Lancashire.

Parliament of England
Preceded by Richard Fleetwood; Richard Assheton	Member of Parliament for Lancashire; 1705–1708; With: Hon. Charles Zedenno Stanley	Succeeded by Parliament of Great Britain
Parliament of Great Britain
Preceded by Parliament of England	Member of Parliament for Lancashire; 1708–1749; With: Hon. Charles Zedenno Stanley 1708-1713; Sir John Bland 1713-1727; Sir Edward Stanley 1727-1736; Peter Bold 1736-1741; Lord Strange 1741-1749	Succeeded by Lord Strange; Peter Bold
Preceded by Thomas Cartwright	Father of the House; 1748-1749	Succeeded by Phillips Gybbon
