= Bowerham =

Coordinates: 54.041°N 2.792°W

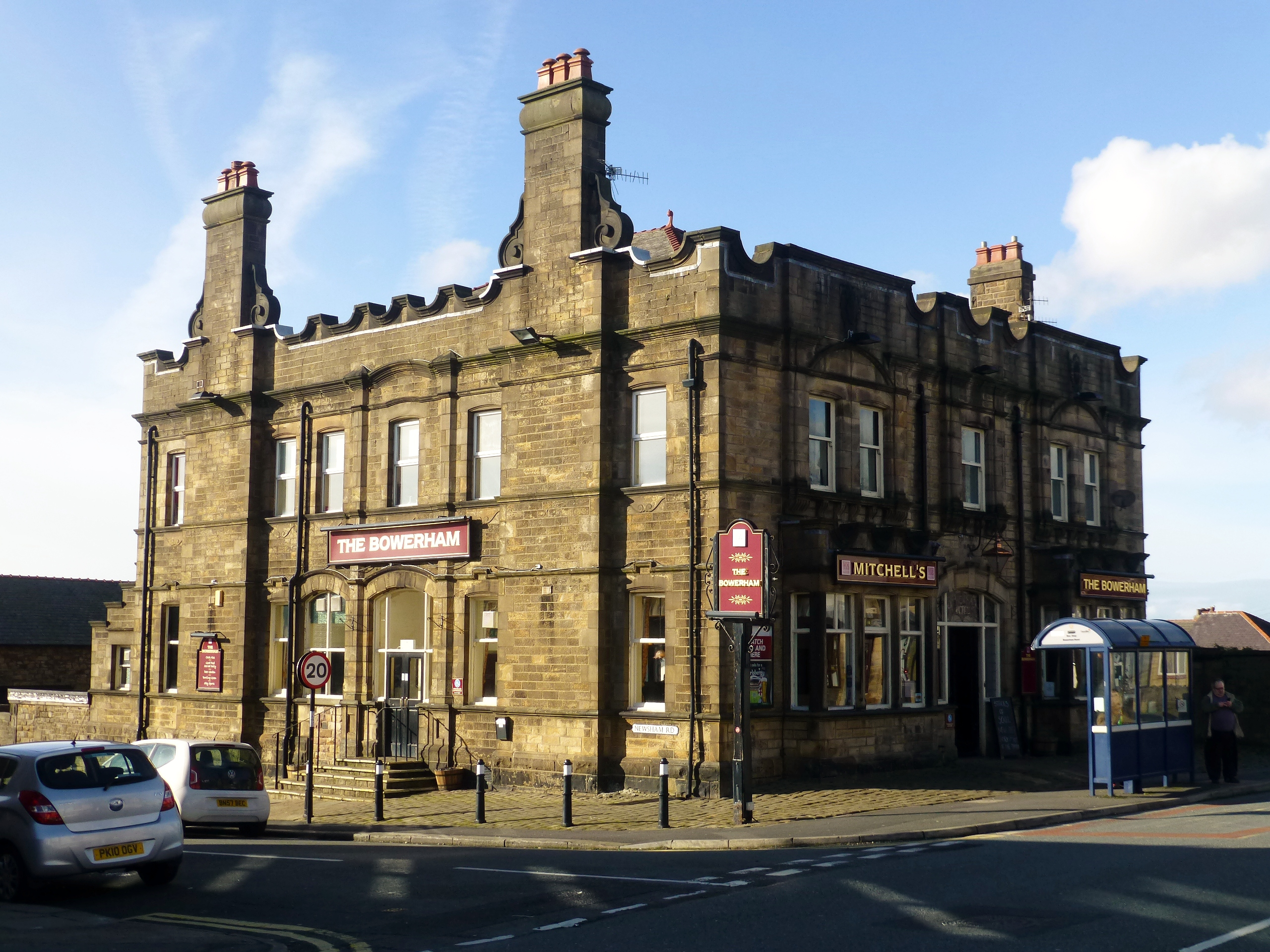
- The Bowerham Hotel

- Location within Lancashire Bowerham (Lancashire)
- District: Lancaster
- Shire county: Lancashire
- Region: North West
- Country: England
- Sovereign state: United Kingdom
- Post town: LANCASTER
- Dialling code: 01524
- Police: Lancashire
- Fire: Lancashire
- Ambulance: North West
- UK Parliament: Lancaster and Wyre

Bowerham is a district within the City of Lancaster in the north of England.

== Origin of the name ==
The name 'Bowerham' is likely a Victorian-era refinement of earlier spelling and pronunciations. An 1844 Ordnance Survey map records a nearby farm called Bowrams, which is considered the probable original site from which the modern name developed.

Historically, the name of the settlement is recorded in a variety of medieval forms. In the early 13th century it appears as Bolerund (1201), Bolron (1212), and Bolrum (1226). The form Bolron remained in use into the early 17th century, and Lancaster's first recorded mayor was 'Robert de Bolron' in 1338.

The etymology of the name is thought to derive from Old English and Old Norse roots. The first element is likely connected to "bull" (recorded in early forms as 'bule'), while the second element is believed to come from the Old Norse runnr, meaning thicket or wooded area. Taken together, the original meaning is interpreted as something akin to "the thicket with the bull". This may refer to a location where a valuable breeding bull was kept over successive generations, though this interpretation remains speculative due to the age and scarcity of early records.

== Vicinity ==
The University of Cumbria, now based in Carlisle, still (as of 2026) maintains a campus in Bowerham Road, Lancaster, on the site of the Bowerham Barracks. The area also includes Williamson Park and the Ashton Memorial, and the former site of a Hornsea Pottery factory.

Bowerham House is a Grade II Listed Building. So is Greaves Park.
