= Edward Smith-Stanley, 12th Earl of Derby =

British peer and politician (1752–1834)

The Right Honourable The Earl of Derby PC
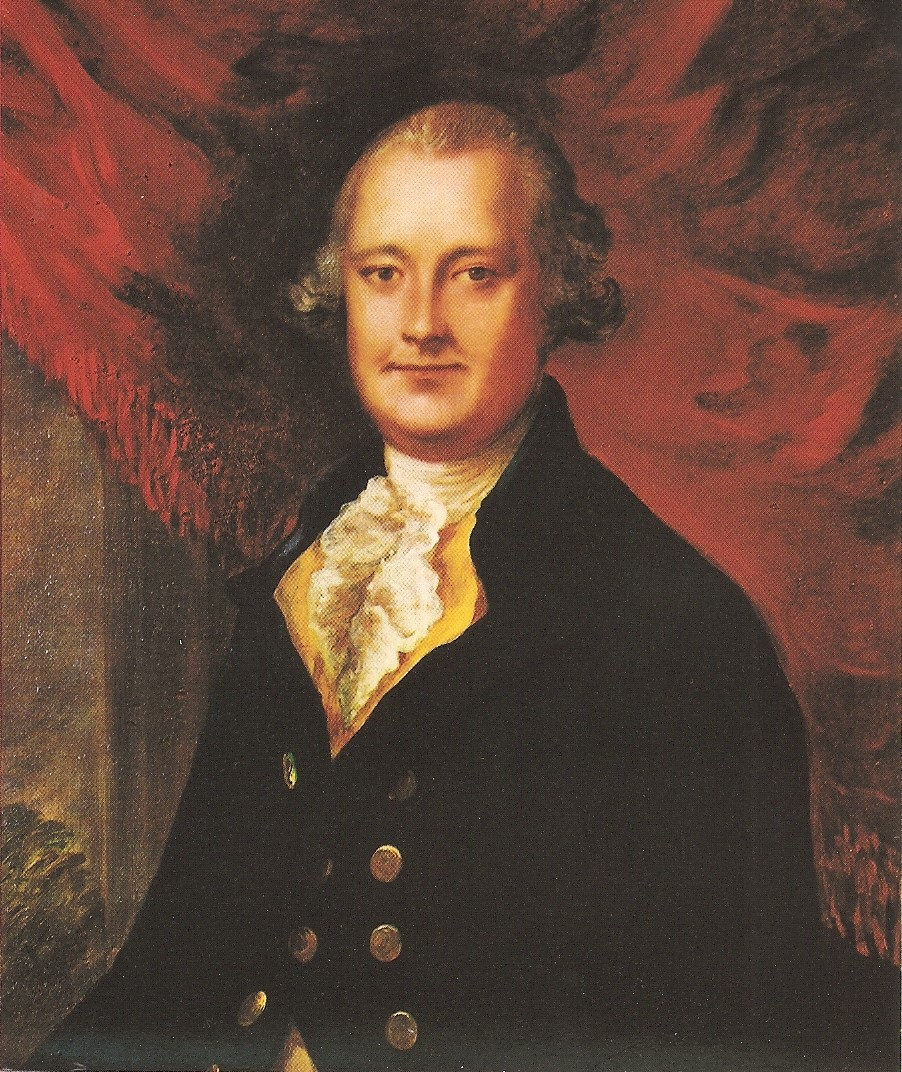

Chancellor of the Duchy of Lancaster
- In office 29 April 1783 – 17 December 1783
- Monarch: George III
- Prime Minister: The Duke of Portland
- Preceded by: The Lord Ashburton
- Succeeded by: The Earl of Clarendon
- In office 12 February 1806 – 31 March 1807
- Monarch: George III
- Prime Minister: The Lord Grenville
- Preceded by: The Lord Harrowby
- Succeeded by: Hon. Spencer Perceval

Personal details
- Born: 1 September 1752 (O.S.) [12 September 1752 (N.S.)]
- Died: 21 October 1834 (aged 82)
- Party: Whig
- Spouse(s): Lady Elizabeth Hamilton (1753–1797); Elizabeth Farren (d. 1829)
- Children: Edward Smith-Stanley, 13th Earl of Derby; Lady Charlotte Hornby; Lady Elizabeth Henrietta Cole
- Parent(s): James Smith-Stanley, Lord Strange; Lucy Smith
- Education: Trinity College, Cambridge

Edward Smith-Stanley, 12th Earl of Derby PC (1 September 1752 O.S. – 21 October 1834), usually styled Lord Stanley from 1771 to 1776, was a British peer and politician of the late eighteenth and early nineteenth centuries. He held office as Chancellor of the Duchy of Lancaster in 1783 in the Fox–North coalition and in 1806 and 1807 in the Ministry of All the Talents.

== Background and education ==
Derby was the son of James Smith-Stanley, Lord Strange (1716–1771), son of Edward Stanley, 11th Earl of Derby (1689-1776). His mother was Lucy Smith, a daughter and co-heiress of Hugh Smith of Weald Hall, Essex. His father had assumed the additional surname and arms of Smith by a private act of Parliament, Stanley's Name Act 1747 (21 Geo. 2. c. 4 Pr.). Derby entered Eton College in 1764, proceeding to Trinity College, Cambridge in 1771.

== Political career ==
Derby was returned to Parliament as one of two representatives for Lancashire in 1774, a seat he held until 1776, when he succeeded his grandfather in the earldom and entered the House of Lords. He served as Chancellor of the Duchy of Lancaster between April and December 1783 in the Fox-North Coalition headed by the Duke of Portland and was sworn into the Privy Council the same year. He remained out of office for the next 23 years but was once again Chancellor of the Duchy of Lancaster between 1806 and 1807 in the Ministry of All the Talents headed by Lord Grenville.

Lord Derby also served as Lord Lieutenant of Lancashire between 1776 and 1834. He was also listed as a subscriber to the Manchester, Bolton and Bury Canal navigation in 1791.

== Horse racing ==
At a dinner party in 1778 held on his estate "The Oaks" in Carshalton, Lord Derby and his friends planned a sweepstake horse race for three-year old fillies, won the following year by Derby's own horse, Bridget. The race, The Oaks, has been named after the estate since. At a celebration after Bridget's win, a similar race for colts was proposed and Derby tossed a coin with Sir Charles Bunbury for the honour of naming the race. Derby won, and the race became known as the Derby Stakes. Bunbury won the initial race in 1780 with his horse, Diomed; Derby himself won it in 1787 with Sir Peter Teazle.

His racing colours were black with a white cap.

His influence on racing has been described as "crucial".

== Cockfighting and gamefowl ==
Lord Derby's love for racing was surpassed only by his passion for gamefowl and cockfighting. As a game fowl breeder, Derby is said to have influenced contemporaries by proving that systematic breeding could be combined with a learned familiarity of one's fowl through daily, attentive care, to increase success.

During his lifetime, Lord Derby established a family of gamefowl, which would remain popular for nearly 200 years after his death.

Derby built a cockpit in Preston at his own expense, and fought there or at Liverpool race meets. He and fellow cocker, General Yates, held annual cockfighting contests with regular stakes between 1,000-3,000 guineas to the winner.

According to an obituary:

So strong was the Earl's addiction to his favourite sport, that cocks have been introduced into his drawing-room, armed and spurred, even during the latter days of his life.

For much of his career, Lord Derby employed a top feeder of the time, Paul Potter, to oversee his training. Potter's son handled these duties later in Lord Derby's life, and would, upon Lord Derby's death, receive possession of all Derby's birds, spurs, bags and fighting equipment, including the silk bags used for transporting the fowl, embroidered in Lord Derby's colours with the image of a fighting cock. He is thought to be the last member of the peerage to openly participate in the sport.

== Family ==
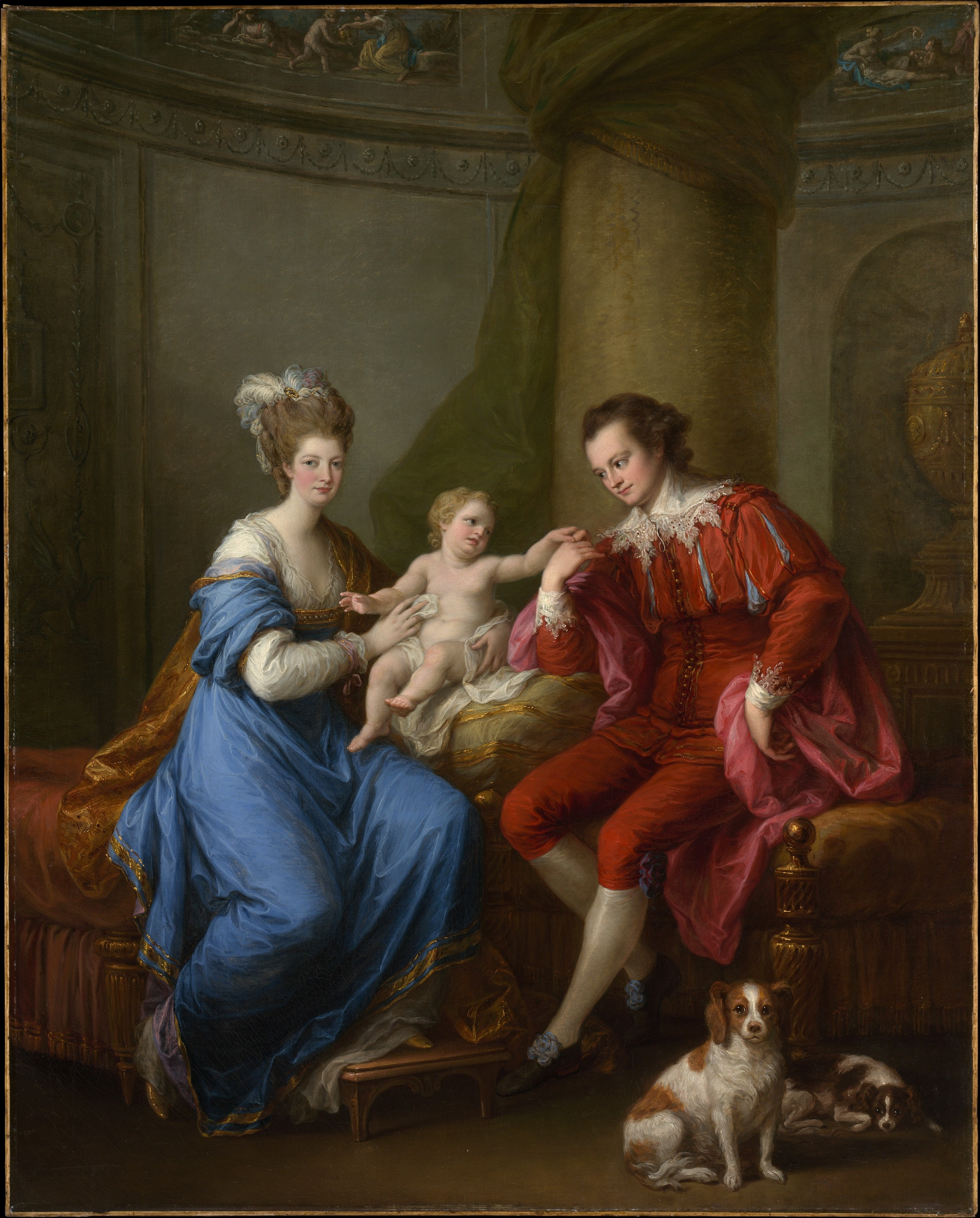
Edward Smith Stanley, Twelfth Earl of Derby, with His First Wife (Lady Elizabeth Hamilton) and Their Son, portrait painting by Angelica Kauffmann, ca 1776

Lord Derby married Lady Elizabeth, daughter of James Hamilton, 6th Duke of Hamilton, on 23 June 1774. They had three children:

- Edward Smith-Stanley, 13th Earl of Derby (21 April 1775 – 30 June 1851); married his cousin Charlotte Margaret Hornby, daughter of Reverend Geoffrey Hornby by his wife, the Hon. Lucy Hornby (née Smith-Stanley)
- Lady Charlotte Stanley (17 October 1776 – 25 November 1805); married her cousin Edmund Hornby, Esq., son of Reverend Geoffrey Hornby by his wife, the Hon. Lucy Hornby (née Smith-Stanley)
- Lady Elizabeth Henrietta Stanley (29 April 1778 – 4 November 1857); married Stephen Thomas Cole, Esq., of Stoke Lyne, Oxfordshire, and Twickenham, and had issue.

In the late 1770s, Lady Derby had a very public affair with John Frederick Sackville, 3rd Duke of Dorset. In 1779, the countess moved out of Lord Derby's house, leaving their children behind, apparently expecting that her husband would agree to a divorce and that the Duke would then marry her. About one year after she left his house, Lord Derby made it known that he had no intention of divorcing his wife; at the same time, he continued to deny her access to her children. The countess was socially ostracised for the remainder of her life. Historian Peter Thomson suggests that the third of the couple's children, Lady Elizabeth Henrietta, was the result of Lady Derby's affair with Dorset. Despite this, the Earl of Derby cared for the child after his wife left him.

Lady Derby died at the age of 44 on 14 March 1797. Six weeks later, on 1 May 1797, Lord Derby married the actress Elizabeth Farren, daughter of George Farren. They had three more children:

- Lady Lucy Elizabeth Stanley (1 March 1799 – 25 April 1809), died young
- Hon. James Stanley (9 March 1800 – 3 April 1817), died young "after a long and painful illness"
- Lady Mary Margaret Stanley (23 March 1801 – December 1858); married Thomas Egerton, 2nd Earl of Wilton.

Lord Derby survived his second wife by five years and died on 21 October 1834, aged 82. He was succeeded in the earldom by his son from his first marriage, Edward, Lord Stanley.

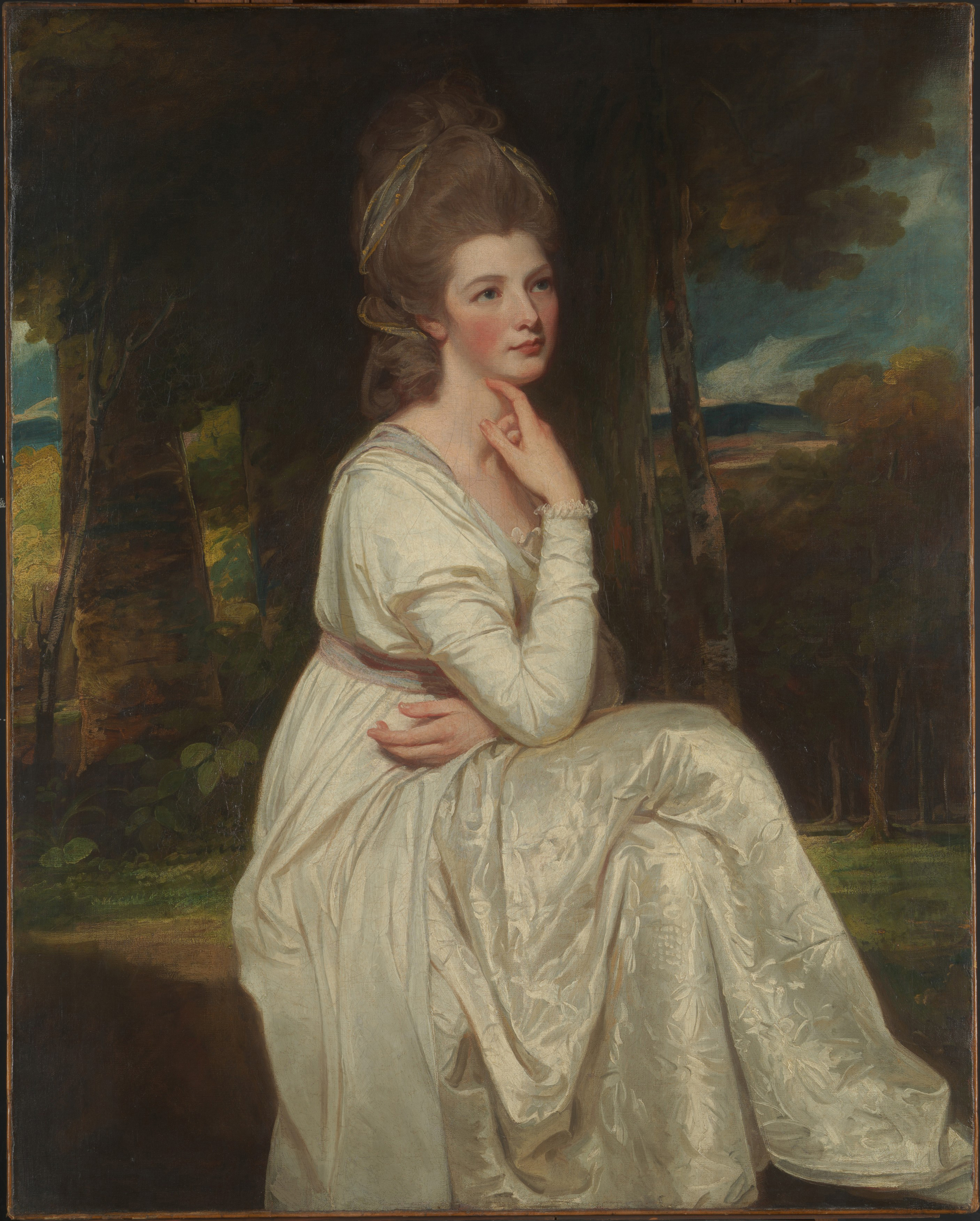
Portrait of Elizabeth, Countess of Derby, by George Romney, ca 1776-1778

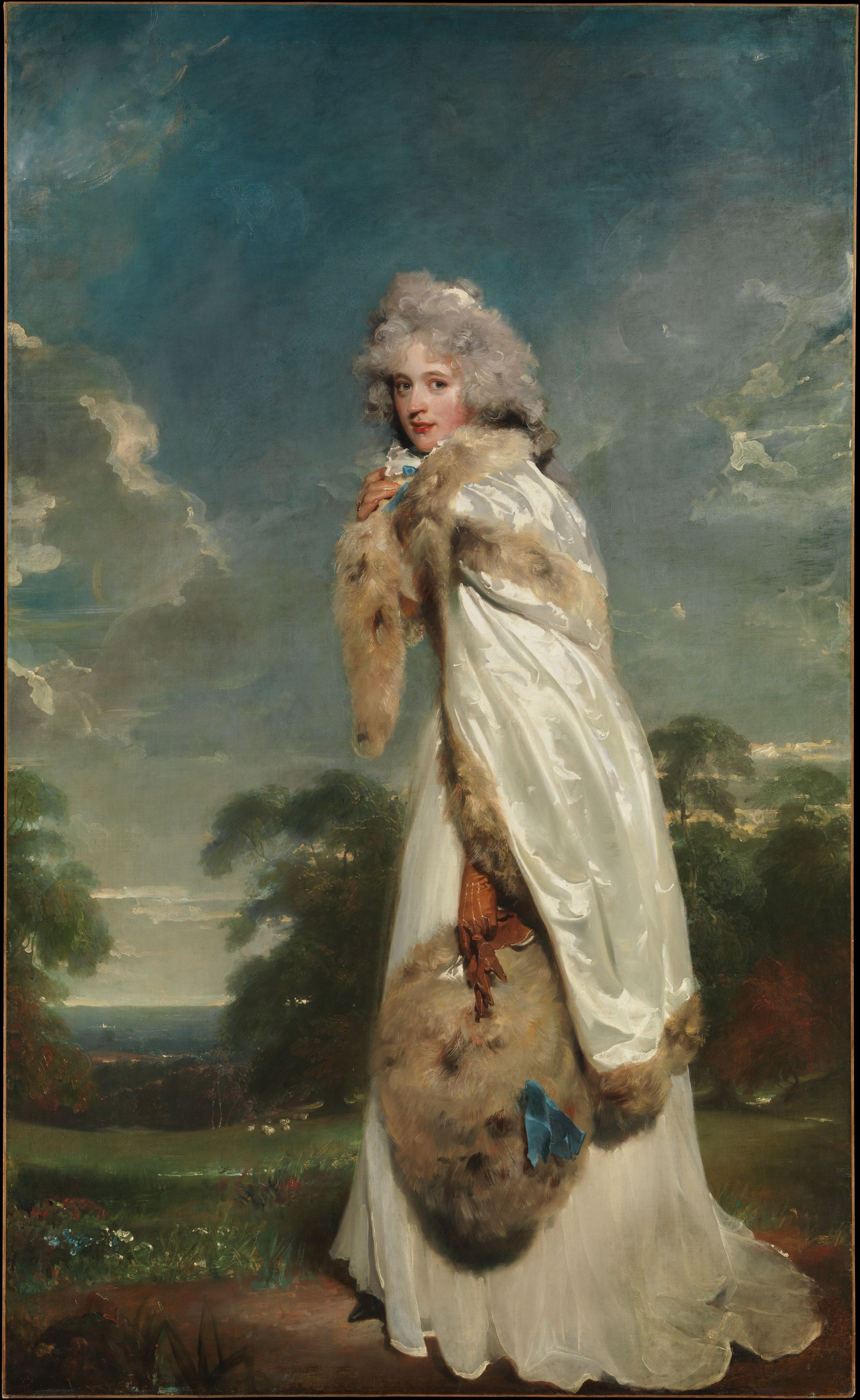
Portrait of Elizabeth Farren, by Thomas Lawrence, 1790

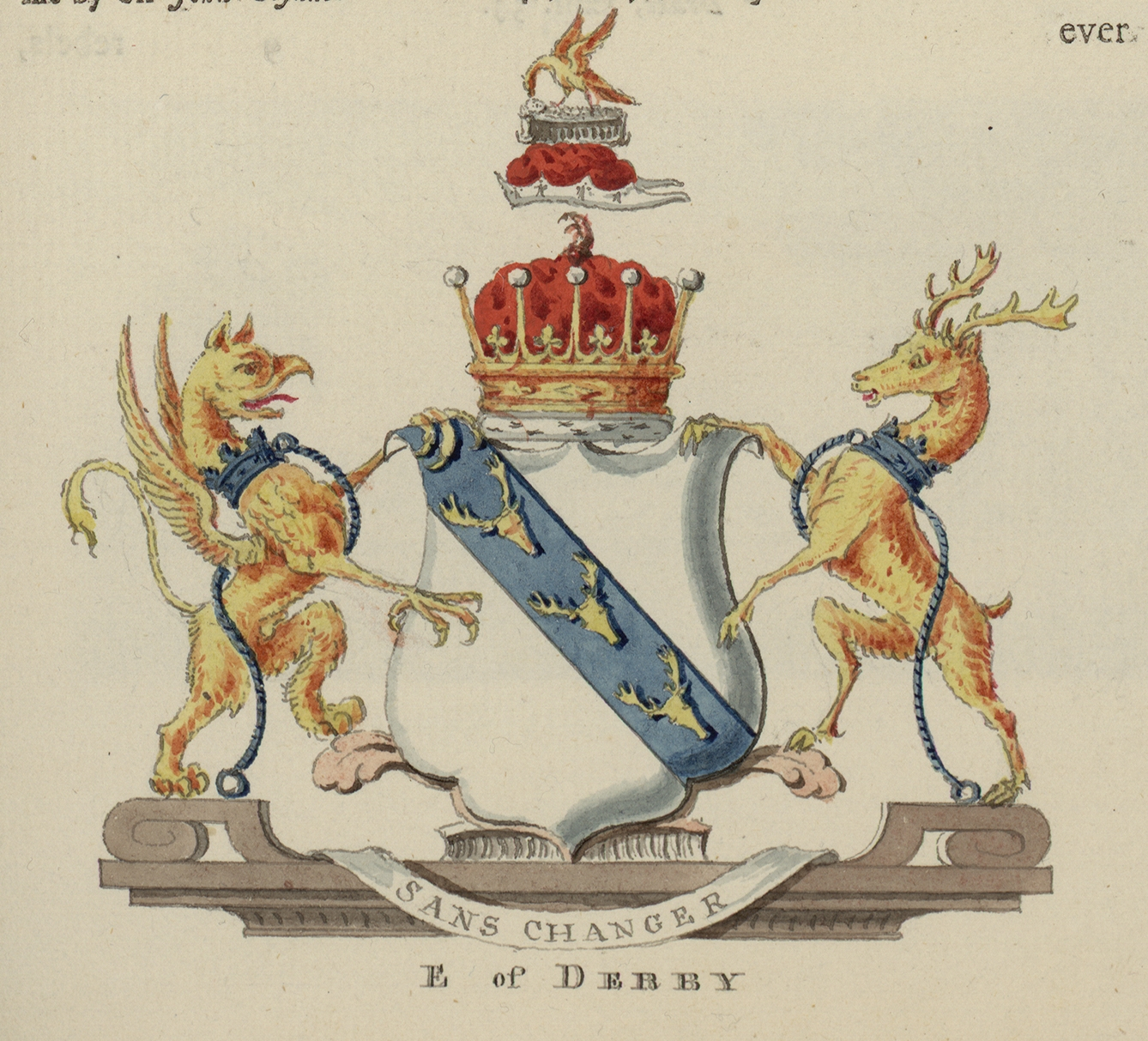
Arms of Stanley, Earl of Derby: Argent, on a bend azure three buck's heads cabossed or. Painted in 1781

== Arms ==
Coat of arms of Edward Smith-Stanley, 12th Earl of Derby
| Crest On a chapeau gules turned up ermine an eagle, wings extended, or, preying on an infant in its cradle proper, swaddled gules, the cradle laced or. Escutcheon Argent, on a bend azure three stags' heads caboshed or. Supporters Dexter, a griffin, wings elevated; sinister, a stag, each or, and ducally collared with line reflexed over the back azure. Motto Sans changer (Without changing). |

Parliament of Great Britain
| Preceded by The Earl of Sefton; Sir Thomas Egerton, Bt | Member of Parliament for Lancashire; 1774–1776; With: Sir Thomas Egerton, Bt | Succeeded by Thomas Stanley; Sir Thomas Egerton, Bt |
Honorary titles
| Preceded by The Earl of Derby | Lord Lieutenant of Lancashire; 1776–1834 | Succeeded by The Earl of Derby |
| Preceded by Lord Robert Spencer | Senior Privy Counsellor; 1831–1834 | Succeeded by The Earl of Clarendon |
Political offices
| Preceded by The Lord Ashburton | Chancellor of the Duchy of Lancaster; 1783 | Succeeded by The Earl of Clarendon |
| Preceded by The Lord Harrowby | Chancellor of the Duchy of Lancaster; 1806–1807 | Succeeded by Hon. Spencer Perceval |
Peerage of England
| Preceded by Edward Stanley | Earl of Derby; 1776–1834 | Succeeded by Edward Stanley |
