= Sir Thomas Stanley, 4th Baronet =

British Member of Parliament

Member of Parliament for Preston
- In office 1695–1698 Serving with Thomas Molyneux
- Monarch: King William III / Queen Mary II
- Preceded by: Christopher Greenfield and Sir Edward Chisenhall
- Succeeded by: Thomas Molyneux and Henry Ashurst
- Constituency: Preston

Sir Thomas Stanley, 4th Baronet (27 September 1670 – 7 May 1714) was a British Member of Parliament.

Stanley was the son of Sir Edward Stanley, 3rd Baronet, and Elizabeth Bosvile, and succeeded his father in the baronetcy at the age of one. This branch of the Stanley family, known as the "Stanleys of Bickerstaffe", were descended from Sir James Stanley, younger brother of Thomas Stanley, 2nd Earl of Derby. Stanley later represented Preston in the House of Commons from 1695 to 1698. He married Elizabeth Patten in 1688, and died in May 1714, aged 43. He was succeeded in the baronetcy by his eldest son Edward Stanley, who in 1736 succeeded a distant relative in the earldom of Derby.

== Notes ==
Parliament of England
Preceded by Christopher Greenfield; Sir Edward Chisenhall	Member of Parliament for Preston; 1695–1698; With: Thomas Molyneux	Succeeded by Thomas Molyneux; Henry Ashhurst
Baronetage of England
Preceded by Edward Stanley	Baronet (of Bickerstaffe); 1671–1714	Succeeded by Edward Stanley
