= Thomas Egerton, 1st Earl of Wilton =

British politician

Thomas Grey Egerton, 1st Earl of Wilton
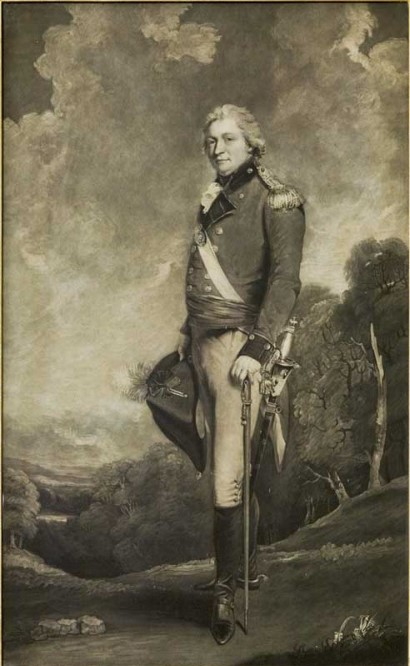
- 1st Earl of Wilton, by Charles Turner, after John Hoppner

Member of Parliament for Lancashire
- In office 1772–1784
- Preceded by: Lord Archibald Hamilton and Charles Molyneux, 1st Earl of Sefton
- Succeeded by: Thomas Stanley (1749–1816) and John Blackburne (1754–1833)

Personal details
- Born: 14 August 1749
- Died: 23 September 1814 (aged 65)
- Spouse: Eleanor Assheton
- Parents: Sir Thomas Grey Egerton, 6th Baronet (father); Catherine Copley (mother)

Thomas Grey Egerton, 1st Earl of Wilton (14 August 1749 – 23 September 1814), known as Sir Thomas Grey Egerton, Bt from 1766 to 1784, was a British politician who sat in the House of Commons from 1772 to 1784 when he was raised to the peerage as Baron Grey de Wilton.

== Early life ==
Egerton was the son of Sir Thomas Grey Egerton, 6th Baronet, of the Egerton family, and his wife Catherine Copley, daughter of Rev. John Copley of Batley, Yorkshire. He was educated at Westminster School in 1764. In 1766 he succeeded his father to the baronetcy. He married Eleanor Assheton, youngest daughter of Sir Ralph Assheton, 3rd Baronet, of Middleton (d. 1765) on 12 September 1769.

== Political career ==
Egerton was returned unopposed as Member of Parliament for Lancashire at a by-election on 4 February 1772. He was re-elected unopposed in 1774 and 1780. In 1778 he raised a regiment of foot at Manchester to serve in the American War. He spoke in Parliament on matters relating to Lancashire, and its trade or industry in particular. He did not stand at the 1784 general election.

On 15 May 1784, he was elevated to the barony of Grey de Wilton held by his ancestors, which was revived when he was raised to the peerage as Baron Grey de Wilton, of Wilton Castle in the County Hereford. The peerage was created with remainder to heirs male of his body. On 26 June 1801, he was further honoured as Viscount Grey de Wilton and Earl of Wilton, of Wilton Castle in the County of Hereford, with remainder to the second and younger sons successively of his daughter Eleanor, wife of Robert Grosvenor, 1st Marquess of Westminster.

Egerton was listed as a subscriber to the Manchester, Bolton and Bury Canal navigation in 1791.

== Later life and legacy ==
Egerton died on 23 September 1814, aged 65. He had no male issue so the title of Baron Grey de Wilton became extinct as he had no sons, while the Baronetcy passed to a distant relative Sir John Grey Egerton, 8th Baronet. He was succeeded in the Viscountcy and Earldom, according to the special remainder, by his grandson Thomas Grosvenor Egerton.

He had one surviving daughter:

- Eleanor, who on 28 April 1794 married Robert Grosvenor, then Viscount Belgrave; in 1802, he became 2nd Earl Grosvenor, and in 1831, the 1st Marquess of Westminster.

== See also ==
- Baron Grey de Wilton
- Earl of Wilton

Parliament of Great Britain
Preceded by Lord Archibald Hamilton; Charles Molyneux	Member of Parliament for Lancashire; 1772–1784; With: Charles Molyneux 1772–1774; Lord Stanley 1774–1776; Thomas Stanley 1776–1780; Thomas Stanley 1780–1784	Succeeded by Thomas Stanley; John Blackburne
Baronetage of England
Preceded by Thomas Grey Egerton	Baronet (of Egerton and Oulton); 1756–1814	Succeeded by John Grey Egerton
Peerage of Great Britain
New creation	Baron Grey de Wilton; 1784–1814	Extinct
Peerage of the United Kingdom
New creation	Earl of Wilton; 1801–1814	Succeeded by Thomas Grosvenor Egerton
