= Bowerham Barracks =

Military installation in Lancaster, England

- Lancaster
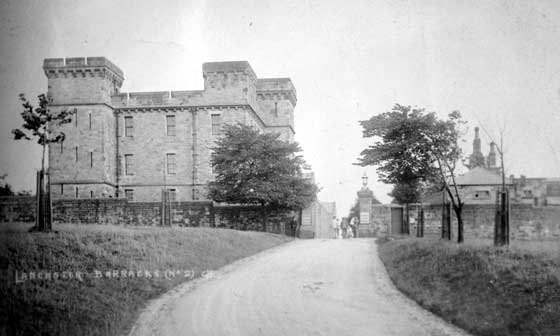
- Bowerham Barracks

Site information
- Type: Barracks
- Owner: Ministry of Defence
- Operator: British Army

Location
- Location within Lancashire
- Coordinates: 54.042841°N 2.786353°W

Site history
- Built: 1876–1880
- Built for: War Office
- In use: 1880-1959

Garrison information
- Occupants: King's Own Royal Regiment (Lancaster)

Bowerham Barracks was a military installation in Lancaster.

== History ==
The barracks were built in the Fortress Gothic Revival Style between 1876 and 1880 on the former Bowerham Estate as the depot for the two battalions of the 4th (King's Own) Regiment of Foot. Their creation took place as part of the Cardwell Reforms which encouraged the localisation of British military forces. Following the Childers Reforms, the 4th Regiment of Foot evolved to become the King's Own Royal Regiment (Lancaster) with its depot at the barracks in 1881.

The Auxiliary Territorial Service used the barracks for training and accommodation during the Second World War. The King's Own Royal Regiment (Lancaster) was amalgamated with the Border Regiment to form the King's Own Royal Border Regiment and the barracks closed in 1959. Although much of the barracks were demolished, the keep was retained and incorporated into the design of St Martin's College which opened in 1967: the site has formed the Lancaster Campus of the University of Cumbria since 2007.
