= 79th Regiment of Foot (Royal Liverpool Volunteers) =

Infantry regiment of the British Army

The 79th Regiment of Foot (Royal Liverpool Volunteers) was an infantry regiment of the British Army, also known as the Liverpool Blues, which served in the Americas during the American War of Independence.

In common with other volunteer regiments formed elsewhere in Britain during the conflict, the 79th was raised at the expense of the port of Liverpool, with the town's corporation contributing £2000. On the 79th's creation in 1778, Major Pole assumed command as its lieutenant-colonel.

The regiment arrived in Jamaica in March 1779 and had detachments assigned the role of marines. In February 1780, the regiment took part in an expedition against the Spanish colony of Nicaragua, ferried by young Captain Horatio Nelson. An evacuation was carried out later in the year because of disease which had become rife in the inhospitable climate, decimating the expedition.

In 1781, Banastre Tarleton became the lieutenant-colonel of the Liverpool Volunteers, though remained in command of the 5th American Regiment (British Legion). An infamous cavalry officer during the American Revolution, Tarleton was the son of a former Mayor of Liverpool.

The regiment returned to Liverpool in early 1784 and disbanded after the war ended. On 4 February 1784, a contingent of seven officers received the freedom of the borough while the regiment's colours were laid up at Liverpool Town Hall.
