= Jenny Zhang =

Jenny Zhang may refer to:

- Jenny Zhang (actress) (born 1987), Chinese actress and singer
- Jenny Zhang (chemist) (fl. 2000s–2020s), Chinese Australian chemist
- Jenny Zhang (writer) (born 1983), American writer, poet, and essayist
- Jenny Tinghui Zhang (writer) (active 2015–present), American writer

== See also ==
- Jennifer Zhang (fl. 2010s), woodwind musician
