= Richard Houghton =

Richard Houghton or Hoghton may refer to:

== Politicians ==
- Richard Houghton (died 1559) (1496/98–1559), MP for Lancashire
- Richard Houghton (died c. 1422) (c. 1322–c. 1422), MP for Lancashire
- Richard Houghton (MP for Wallingford) (fl. 1469), MP for Wallingford
- Sir Richard Hoghton, 1st Baronet (1570–1630), MP for Lancashire
- Sir Richard Hoghton, 3rd Baronet (c. 1616–1678), MP for Lancashire

== Others ==
- Richard Houghton (lieutenant), commander during Royalton raid
- Richard Houghton (rally driver) in 2009 Australian Rally Championship etc.

== See also ==
- Richard A. Houghten, organic chemist
- Richard Haughton (disambiguation)
