= Medicinal chemistry =

Scientific branch of chemistry

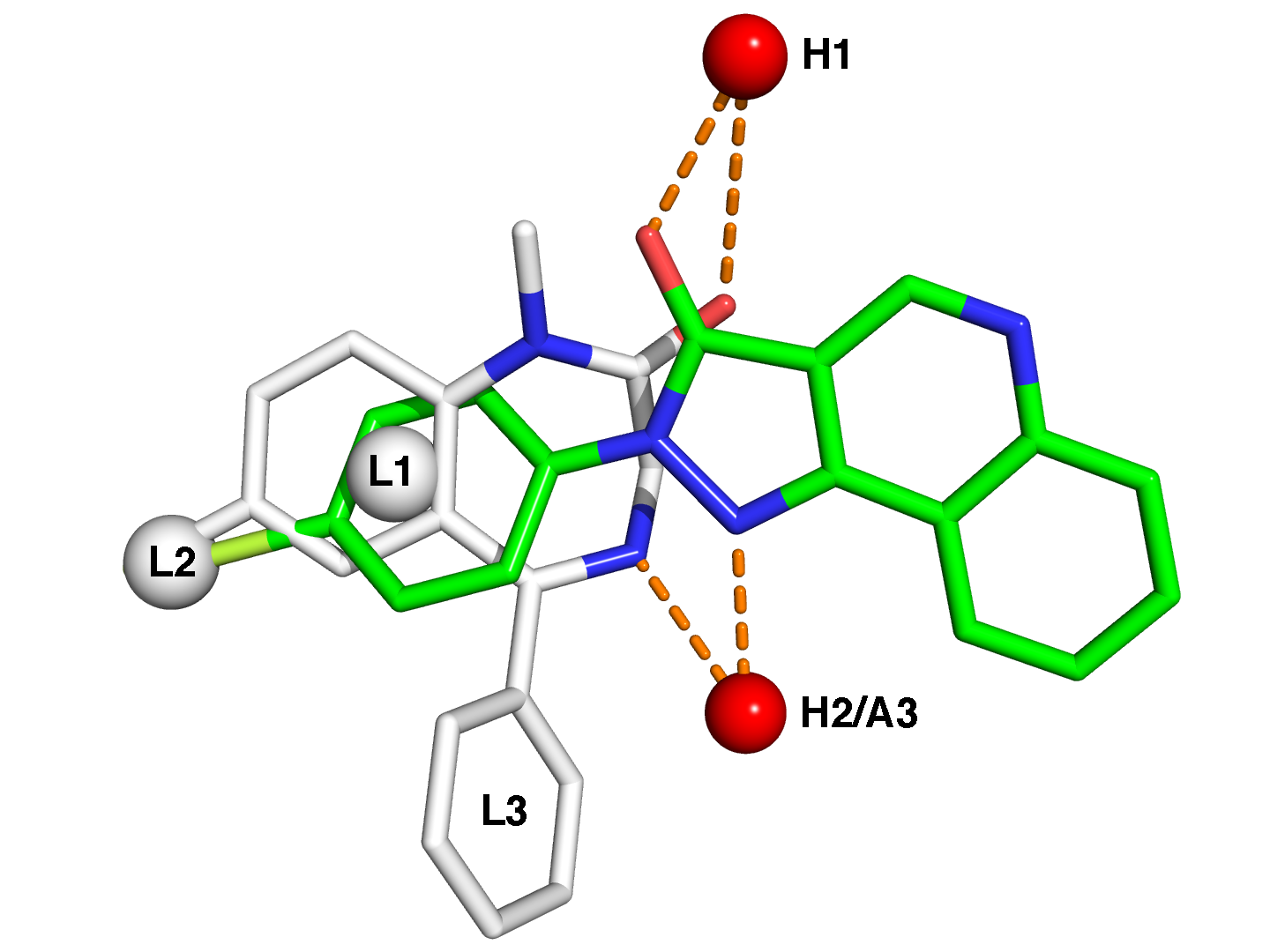
Pharmacophore model of the benzodiazepine binding site on the GABA_{A} receptor

Medicinal or pharmaceutical chemistry is a scientific discipline at the intersection of chemistry and pharmacy involved with designing and developing pharmaceutical drugs. Medicinal chemistry involves the identification, synthesis and development of new chemical entities suitable for therapeutic use by using structure. It also includes the study of existing drugs, their biological properties, and their quantitative structure-activity relationships (QSAR).

Medicinal chemistry is a basically interdisciplinary science combining organic chemistry with biochemistry, computational chemistry, pharmacology, molecular biology, statistics, and physical chemistry.

Compounds used as medicines are most often organic compounds, which are often divided into the broad classes of small organic molecules (e.g., atorvastatin, fluticasone, clopidogrel) and "biologics" (infliximab, erythropoietin, insulin glargine), the latter of which are most often medicinal preparations of proteins (natural and recombinant antibodies, hormones etc.). Medicines can also be inorganic and organometallic compounds, commonly referred to as metallodrugs (e.g., platinum, lithium and gallium-based agents such as cisplatin, lithium carbonate and gallium nitrate, respectively). The discipline of Medicinal Inorganic Chemistry investigates the role of metals in medicine metallotherapeutics, which involves the study and treatment of diseases and health conditions associated with inorganic metals in biological systems. There are several metallotherapeutics approved for the treatment of cancer (e.g., contain Pt, Ru, Gd, Ti, Ge, V, and Ga), antimicrobials (e.g., Ag, Cu, and Ru), diabetes (e.g., V and Cr), broad-spectrum antibiotic (e.g., Bi), bipolar disorder (e.g., Li). Other areas of study include: metallomics, genomics, proteomics, diagnostic agents (e.g., MRI: Gd, Mn; X-ray: Ba, I) and radiopharmaceuticals (e.g., ^{99m}Tc for diagnostics, ^{186}Re for therapeutics).

In particular, medicinal chemistry in its most common practice—focusing on small organic molecules—encompasses synthetic organic chemistry and aspects of natural products and computational chemistry in close combination with chemical biology, enzymology and structural biology, together aiming at the discovery and development of new therapeutic agents. Practically speaking, it involves chemical aspects of identification, and then systematic, thorough synthetic alteration of new chemical entities to make them suitable for therapeutic use. It includes synthetic and computational aspects of the study of existing drugs and agents in development in relation to their bioactivities (biological activities and properties), i.e., understanding their structure–activity relationships (SAR). Pharmaceutical chemistry is focused on quality aspects of medicines and aims to assure fitness for purpose of medicinal products.

At the biological interface, medicinal chemistry combines to form a set of highly interdisciplinary sciences, setting its organic, physical, and computational emphases alongside biological areas such as biochemistry, molecular biology, pharmacognosy and pharmacology, toxicology and veterinary and human medicine; these, with project management, statistics, and pharmaceutical business practices, systematically oversee altering identified chemical agents such that after pharmaceutical formulation, they are safe and efficacious, and therefore suitable for use in treatment of disease.

== In the path of drug discovery ==
=== Discovery ===
Discovery is the identification of novel active chemical compounds, often called "hits", which are typically found by assay of compounds for a desired biological activity. Initial hits can come from repurposing existing agents toward a new pathologic processes, and from observations of biologic effects of new or existing natural products from bacteria, fungi, plants, etc. In addition, hits also routinely originate from structural observations of small molecule "fragments" bound to therapeutic targets (enzymes, receptors, etc.), where the fragments serve as starting points to develop more chemically complex forms by synthesis. Finally, hits also regularly originate from en-masse testing of chemical compounds against biological targets using biochemical or chemoproteomics assays, where the compounds may be from novel synthetic chemical libraries known to have particular properties (kinase inhibitory activity, diversity or drug-likeness, etc.), or from historic chemical compound collections or libraries created through combinatorial chemistry. While a number of approaches toward the identification and development of hits exist, the most successful techniques are based on chemical and biological intuition developed in team environments through years of rigorous practice aimed solely at discovering new therapeutic agents.

=== Hit to lead and lead optimization ===
Further chemistry and analysis is necessary, first to identify the "triage" compounds that do not provide series displaying suitable SAR and chemical characteristics associated with long-term potential for development, then to improve the remaining hit series concerning the desired primary activity, as well as secondary activities and physiochemical properties such that the agent will be useful when administered in real patients. In this regard, chemical modifications can improve the recognition and binding geometries (pharmacophores) of the candidate compounds, and so their affinities for their targets, as well as improving the physicochemical properties of the molecule that underlie necessary pharmacokinetic/pharmacodynamic (PK/PD), and toxicologic profiles (stability toward metabolic degradation, lack of geno-, hepatic, and cardiac toxicities, etc.) such that the chemical compound or biologic is suitable for introduction into animal and human studies.

=== Process chemistry and development ===
The final synthetic chemistry stages involve the production of a lead compound in suitable quantity and quality to allow large scale animal testing, and then human clinical trials. This involves the optimization of the synthetic route for bulk industrial production, and discovery of the most suitable drug formulation. The former of these is still the bailiwick of medicinal chemistry, the latter brings in the specialization of formulation science (with its components of physical and polymer chemistry and materials science). The synthetic chemistry specialization in medicinal chemistry aimed at adaptation and optimization of the synthetic route for industrial scale syntheses of hundreds of kilograms or more is termed process synthesis, and involves thorough knowledge of acceptable synthetic practice in the context of large scale reactions (reaction thermodynamics, economics, safety, etc.). Critical at this stage is the transition to more stringent GMP requirements for material sourcing, handling, and chemistry.

=== Synthetic analysis ===
The synthetic methodology employed in medicinal chemistry is subject to constraints that do not apply to traditional organic synthesis. Owing to the prospect of scaling the preparation, safety is of paramount importance. The potential toxicity of reagents affects methodology.

=== Structural analysis ===
The structures of pharmaceuticals are assessed in many ways, in part as a means to predict efficacy, stability, and accessibility. Lipinski's rule of five focus on the number of hydrogen bond donors and acceptors, number of rotatable bonds, surface area, and lipophilicity. Other parameters by which medicinal chemists assess or classify their compounds are: synthetic complexity, chirality, flatness, and aromatic ring count.

Structural analysis of lead compounds is often performed through computational methods prior to actual synthesis of the ligand(s). This is done for a number of reasons, including but not limited to: time and financial considerations (expenditure, etc.). Once the ligand of interest has been synthesized in the laboratory, analysis is then performed by traditional methods (TLC, NMR, GC/MS, and others).

== Training ==
Medicinal chemistry is by nature an interdisciplinary science, and practitioners have a strong background in organic chemistry, which must eventually be coupled with a broad understanding of biological concepts related to cellular drug targets. Scientists in medicinal chemistry work are principally industrial scientists (but see following), working as part of an interdisciplinary team that uses their chemistry abilities, especially, their synthetic abilities, to use chemical principles to design effective therapeutic agents. The length of training is intense, with practitioners often required to attain a 4-year bachelor's degree followed by a 4–6 year Ph.D. in organic chemistry. Most training regimens also include a postdoctoral fellowship period of 2 or more years after receiving a Ph.D. in chemistry, making the total length of training range from 10 to 12 years of college education. However, employment opportunities at the Master's level also exist in the pharmaceutical industry, and at that and the Ph.D. level there are further opportunities for employment in academia and government.

Graduate level programs in medicinal chemistry can be found in traditional medicinal chemistry or pharmaceutical sciences departments, both of which are traditionally associated with schools of pharmacy, and in some chemistry departments. However, the majority of working medicinal chemists have graduate degrees (MS, but especially Ph.D.) in organic chemistry, rather than medicinal chemistry, and the preponderance of positions are in research, where the net is necessarily cast widest, and most broad synthetic activity occurs.

In research of small molecule therapeutics, an emphasis on training that provides for breadth of synthetic experience and "pace" of bench operations is clearly present (e.g., for individuals with pure synthetic organic and natural products synthesis in Ph.D. and post-doctoral positions, ibid.). In the medicinal chemistry specialty areas associated with the design and synthesis of chemical libraries or the execution of process chemistry aimed at viable commercial syntheses (areas generally with fewer opportunities), training paths are often much more varied (e.g., including focused training in physical organic chemistry, library-related syntheses, etc.).

As such, most entry-level workers in medicinal chemistry, especially in the U.S., do not have formal training in medicinal chemistry but receive the necessary medicinal chemistry and pharmacologic background after employment—at entry into their work in a pharmaceutical company, where the company provides its particular understanding or model of "medichem" training through active involvement in practical synthesis on therapeutic projects. (The same is somewhat true of computational medicinal chemistry specialties, but not to the same degree as in synthetic areas.)

== See also ==
- Bioisostere
- Biological machines
- Chemoproteomics
- Drug design
- Pharmacognosy
- Pharmacokinetics
- Pharmacology
- Pharmacophore
- Xenobiotic metabolism
