= DNA-encoded chemical library =

Technology for screening small molecule compounds

DNA-encoded chemical libraries (DECL) is a technology for the synthesis and screening on an unprecedented scale of collections of small molecule compounds. DECL is used in medicinal chemistry to bridge the fields of combinatorial chemistry and molecular biology. The aim of DECL technology is to accelerate the drug discovery process and in particular early phase discovery activities such as target validation and hit identification.

DECL technology involves the conjugation of chemical compounds or building blocks to short DNA fragments that serve as identification bar codes and in some cases also direct and control the chemical synthesis. The technique enables the mass creation and interrogation of libraries via affinity selection, typically on an immobilized protein target. A homogeneous method for screening DNA-encoded libraries (DELs), known as Binder Trap Enrichment (BTE), was described in 2015 and uses water-in-oil emulsion technology to isolate, count and identify individual ligand-target complexes in a single-tube approach. In contrast to conventional screening procedures such as high-throughput screening, biochemical assays are not required for binder identification, in principle allowing the isolation of binders to a wide range of proteins historically difficult to tackle with conventional screening technologies. So, in addition to the general discovery of target specific molecular compounds, the availability of binders to pharmacologically important, but so-far “undruggable” target proteins opens new possibilities to develop novel drugs for diseases that could not be treated so far. In eliminating the requirement to initially assess the activity of hits it is hoped and expected that many of the high affinity binders identified will be shown to be active in independent analysis of selected hits, therefore offering an efficient method to identify high quality hits and pharmaceutical leads.

== DNA-encoded chemical libraries and display technologies ==
Until recently, the application of molecular evolution in the laboratory had been limited to display technologies involving biological molecules, where small molecules lead discovery was considered beyond this biological approach. DELs have opened the field of display technology to include non-natural compounds such as small molecules, extending the application of molecular evolution and natural selection to the identification of small molecule compounds of desired activity and function. DNA encoded chemical libraries bear resemblance to biological display technologies such as antibody phage display technology, yeast display, mRNA display and aptamer SELEX. In antibody phage display, antibodies are physically linked to phage particles that bear the gene coding for the attached antibody, which is equivalent to a physical linkage of a “phenotype” (the protein) and a “genotype” (the gene encoding for the protein ). Phage-displayed antibodies can be isolated from large antibody libraries by mimicking molecular evolution: through rounds of selection (on an immobilized protein target), amplification and translation. In DELs the linkage of a small molecule to an identifier DNA code allows the facile identification of binding molecules. DELs are subjected to affinity selection procedures on an immobilized target protein of choice, after which non-binders are removed by washing steps, and binders can subsequently be amplified by polymerase chain reaction (PCR) and identified by virtue of their DNA code (e.g.by DNA sequencing). In evolution-based DEL technologies hits can be further enriched by performing rounds of selection, PCR amplification and translation in analogy to biological display systems such as antibody phage display. This makes it possible to work with much larger libraries.

== History ==
“Synthesize a multi-component mixture of compounds in a single process and screen it also a single process”. This is the principle of combinatorial chemistry invented by Prof. Furka Á. (Eötvös Loránd University Budapest Hungary) in 1982, and described it including the method of synthesis of combinatorial libraries and that of a deconvolution strategy in a document notarized in the same year. Motivations that led to the invention had been published in 2002. DNA encoded chemical libraries (DECLs) are synthesized by the combinatorial chemistry principle and it clearly agrees with their application.

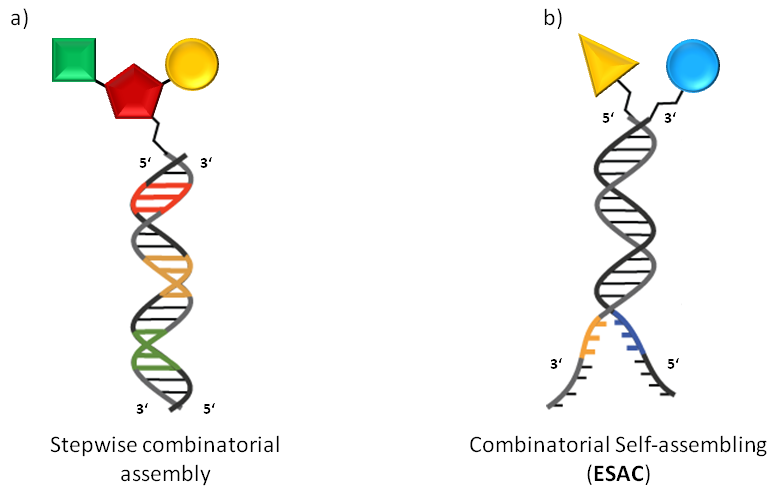
Fig. 1 DNA-encoded library displaying chemical compounds Schematic representation of DNA-encoded library displaying chemical compounds directly attached to oligonucleotides. a) Library generated by “stepwise combinatorial” assembling presenting a single oligonucleotide covalently linked to a putative binding molecule. b) Library construct in “combinatorial self-assembling” fashion (Encoded Self-Assembling Chemical library). Multiple pairing oligonucleotides display a covalently linked binding molecule

The concept of DNA-encoding was first described in a theoretical paper by Sydney Brenner and Richard Lerner in 1992 in which was proposed to link each molecule of a chemically synthesized entity to a particular oligonucleotide sequence constructed in parallel and to use this encoding genetic tag to identify and enrich active compounds. In 1993 the first practical implementation of this approach was presented by J Nielsen, S. Brenner and K. Janda and similarly by the group of M.A. Gallop. Brenner and Janda suggested to generate individual encoded library members by an alternating parallel combinatorial synthesis of the heteropolymeric chemical compound and the appropriate oligonucleotide sequence on the same bead in a “split-&-pool”-based fashion (see below).

Since unprotected DNA is restricted to a narrow window of conventional reaction conditions, until the end of the 1990s a number of alternative encoding strategies were envisaged (i.e. MS-based compound tagging, peptide encoding, haloaromatic tagging, encoding by secondary amines, semiconductor devices.), mainly to avoid inconvenient solid phase DNA synthesis and to create easily screenable combinatorial libraries in high-throughput fashion. However, the selective amplificability of DNA greatly facilitates library screening and it becomes indispensable for the encoding of organic compounds libraries of this unprecedented size. Consequently, at the beginning of the 2000s DNA-combinatorial chemistry experienced a revival.

The beginning of the millennium saw the introduction of several independent developments in DEL technology. These technologies can be classified under two general categories: non-evolution-based and evolution-based DEL technologies capable of molecular evolution. The first category benefits from the ability to use off the shelf reagents and therefore enables rather straightforward library generation. Hits can be identified by DNA sequencing, however DNA translation and therefore molecular evolution is not feasible by these methods. The split and pool approaches developed by researchers at Praecis Pharmaceuticals (now owned by GlaxoSmithKline), Nuevolution (Copenhagen, Denmark) and encoded self- assembled chemical (ESAC) technology developed in the laboratory of Prof D. Neri (Institute of Pharmaceutical Science, Zurich, Switzerland) fall under this category. ESAC technology sets itself apart being a combinatorial self-assembling approach which resembles fragment based hit discovery (Fig 1b). Here DNA annealing enables discrete building block combinations to be sampled, but no chemical reaction takes place between them. Examples of evolution-based DEL technologies are DNA-routing developed by Prof. D.R. Halpin and Prof. P.B. Harbury (Stanford University, Stanford, CA), DNA-templated synthesis developed by Prof. D. Liu (Harvard University, Cambridge, MA) and commercialized by Ensemble Therapeutics (Cambridge, MA) and YoctoReactor technology. developed and commercialized by Vipergen (Copenhagen, Denmark). These technologies are described in further detail below. DNA-templated synthesis and YoctoReactor technology require the prior conjugation of chemical building blocks (BB) to a DNA oligonucleotide tag before library assembly, therefore more upfront work is required before library assembly. Furthermore, the DNA tagged BBs enable the generation of a genetic code for synthesized compounds and artificial translation of the genetic code is possible: That is the BB's can be recalled by the PCR-amplified genetic code, and the library compounds can be regenerated. This, in turn, enables the principle of Darwinian natural selection and evolution to be applied to small molecule selection in direct analogy to biological display systems; through rounds of selection, amplification and translation.

== Combinatorial libraries ==
A combinatorial library is a set of compounds prepared by Combinatorial chemistry, typically by systematically combining sets of chemical building blocks. Such libraries may be organized in pools or sublibraries.

Combinatorial synthesis is particularly suited to DNA-encoded chemical libraries because large numbers of compounds can be generated through repeated combination of building blocks, while the associated DNA tags provide a way to identify the individual library members.

=== Split-&-Pool DNA Encoding ===
In order to apply combinatorial chemistry for the synthesis of DNA-encoded chemical libraries, a Split-&-Pool approach was pursued. Initially a set of unique DNA-oligonucleotides (n) each containing a specific coding sequence is chemically conjugated to a corresponding set of small organic molecules. Consequently, the oligonucleotide-conjugate compounds are mixed ("Pool") and divided ("Split") into a number of groups (m). In appropriate conditions a second set of building blocks (m) are coupled to the first one and a further oligonucleotide which is coding for the second modification is enzymatically introduced before mixing again. This “split-&-pool” steps can be iterated a number of times (r) increasing at each round the library size in a combinatorial manner (i.e. (n x m)^{r}). Alternatively, peptide nucleic acids have been used to encode libraries prepared by "split-&-pool" method. A benefit of PNA-encoding is that the chemistry can be performed by standard SPPS.

=== Stepwise coupling of coding DNA fragments to nascent organic molecules ===
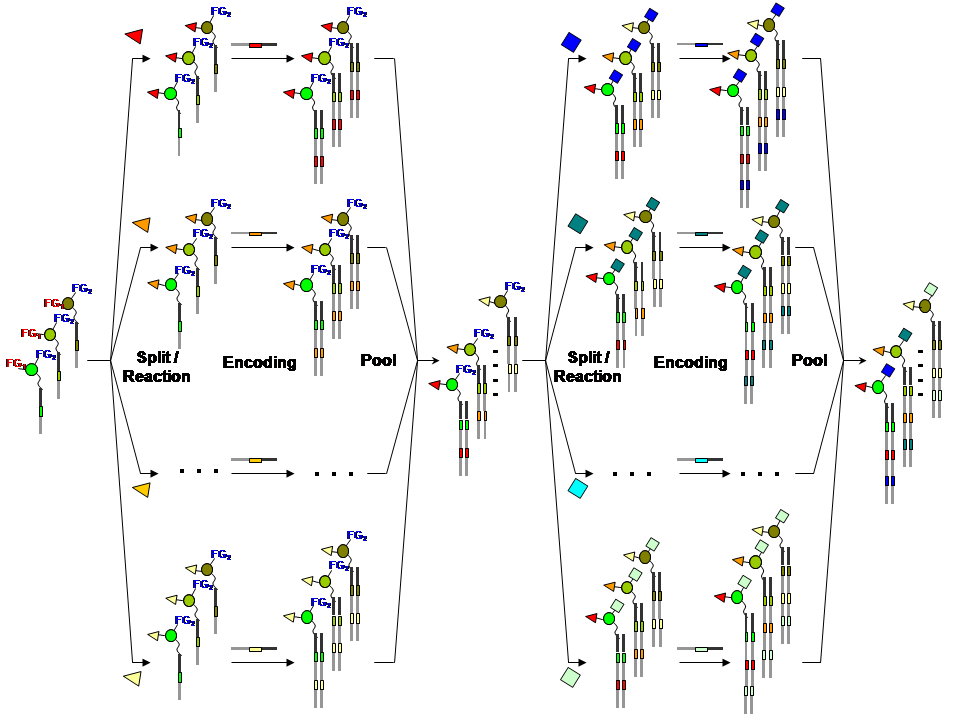
Fig. 3 DNA-encoded library by "Split-&-Pool stepwise coupling of coding DNA fragments to nascent organic molecules An initial set of multifunctional building blocks (FGn represents the different orthogonal functional groups) are covalently conjugated to a corresponding encoding oligonucleotide and reacted in a split-&-pool fashion on a specific functional group (FG1 in red) with a suitable collection of reagents. Following enzymatic encoding, a further round of split-&-pool is initiated. At this stage the second functional group (FG2 in blue) undergoes an additional reaction step with a different set of suitable reagents. The identity of the final modification could be ensured yet again by enzymatic DNA encoding by means of a further oligonucleotide carrying a specific coding region.

A promising strategy for the construction of DNA-encoded libraries is represented by the use of multifunctional building blocks covalently conjugated to an oligonucleotide serving as a “core structure” for library synthesis. In a ‘pool-and-split’ fashion a set of multifunctional scaffolds undergo orthogonal reactions with series of suitable reactive partners. Following each reaction step, the identity of the modification is encoded by an enzymatic addition of DNA segment to the original DNA “core structure”. The use of N-protected amino acids covalently attached to a DNA fragment allow, after a suitable deprotection step, a further amide bond formation with a series of carboxylic acids or a reductive amination with aldehydes. Similarly, diene carboxylic acids used as scaffolds for library construction at the 5’-end of amino modified oligonucleotide, could be subjected to a Diels-Alder reaction with a variety of maleimide derivatives. After completion of the desired reaction step, the identity of the chemical moiety added to the oligonucleotide is established by the annealing of a partially complementary oligonucleotide and by a subsequent Klenow fill-in DNA-polymerization, yielding a double stranded DNA fragment. The synthetic and encoding strategies described above enable the facile construction of DNA-encoded libraries of a size up to 10^{4} member compounds carrying two sets of “building blocks”. However the stepwise addition of at least three independent sets of chemical moieties to a tri-functional core building block for the construction and encoding of a very large DNA-encoded library (comprising up to 10^{6} compounds) can also be envisaged.(Fig.2)

=== Combinatorial self-assembling ===
==== Encoded self-assembling chemical libraries ====
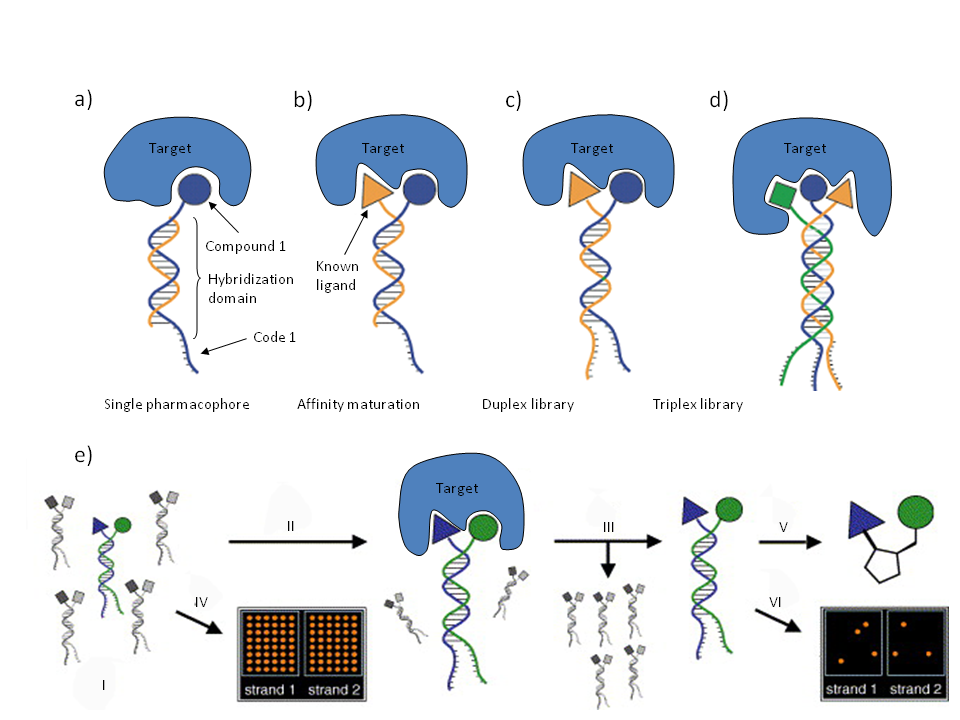
Fig. 4 ESAC library technology overview Small organic molecules are coupled to 5’-amino modified oligonucleotides, containing a hybridization domain and a unique coding sequence, which ensure the identity of the coupled molecule. The ESAC library can be used in single pharmacophore format (a), in affinity maturations of known binders (b), or in de novo selections of binding molecules by self assembling of sublibraries in DNA-double strand format (c) as well as in DNA-triplexes (d). The ESAC library in the selected format is used in a selection and read-out procedure (e). Following incubation of the library (i) with the target protein of choice (ii) and washing of unbound molecules (iii), the oligonucleotide codes of the binding compounds are PCR-amplified and compared with the library without selection on oligonucleotide micro-arrays (iv, v). Identified binders/binding pairs are validated after conjugation (if appropriate) to suitable scaffolds (vi).

Encoded Self-Assembling Chemical (ESAC) libraries rely on the principle that two sublibraries of a size of x members (e.g. 10^{3}) containing a constant complementary hybridization domain can yield a combinatorial DNA-duplex library after hybridization with a complexity of x^{2} uniformly represented library members (e.g. 10^{6}). Each sub-library member would consist of an oligonucleotide containing a variable, coding region flanked by a constant DNA sequence, carrying a suitable chemical modification at the oligonucleotide extremity. The ESAC sublibraries can be used in at least four different embodiments.

- A sub-library can be paired with a complementary oligonucleotide and used as a DNA encoded library displaying a single covalently linked compound for affinity-based selection experiments.
- A sub-library can be paired with an oligonucleotide displaying a known binder to the target, thus enabling affinity maturation strategies.
- Two individual sublibraries can be assembled combinatorially and used for the de novo identification of bidentate binding molecules.
- Three different sublibraries can be assembled to form a combinatorial triplex library.

Preferential binders isolated from an affinity-based selection can be PCR-amplified and decoded on complementary oligonucleotide microarrays or by concatenation of the codes, subcloning and sequencing. The individual building blocks can eventually be conjugated using suitable linkers to yield a drug-like high-affinity compound. The characteristics of the linker (e.g. length, flexibility, geometry, chemical nature and solubility) influence the binding affinity and the chemical properties of the resulting binder.(Fig.3)

Bio-panning experiments on HSA of a 600-member ESAC library allowed the isolation of the 4-(p-iodophenyl)butanoic moiety. The compound represents the core structure of a series of portable albumin binding molecules and of Albufluor a recently developed fluorescein angiographic contrast agent currently under clinical evaluation.

ESAC technology has been used for the isolation of potent inhibitors of bovine trypsin and for the identification of novel inhibitors of stromelysin-1 (MMP-3), a matrix metalloproteinase involved in both physiological and pathological tissue remodeling processes, as well as in disease processes, such as arthritis and metastasis.

== Evolution-based technologies ==
=== DNA-routing ===
In 2004, D.R. Halpin and P.B. Harbury presented a novel intriguing method for the construction of DNA-encoded libraries. For the first time the DNA-conjugated templates served for both encoding and programming the infrastructure of the “split-&-pool” synthesis of the library components. The design of Halpin and Harbury enabled alternating rounds of selection, PCR amplification and diversification with small organic molecules, in complete analogy to phage display technology. The DNA-routing machinery consists of a series of connected columns bearing resin-bound anticodons, which could sequence-specifically separate a population of DNA-templates into spatially distinct locations by hybridization. According to this split-and-pool protocol a peptide combinatorial library DNA-encoded of 10^{6} members was generated.

=== DNA-templated synthesis ===
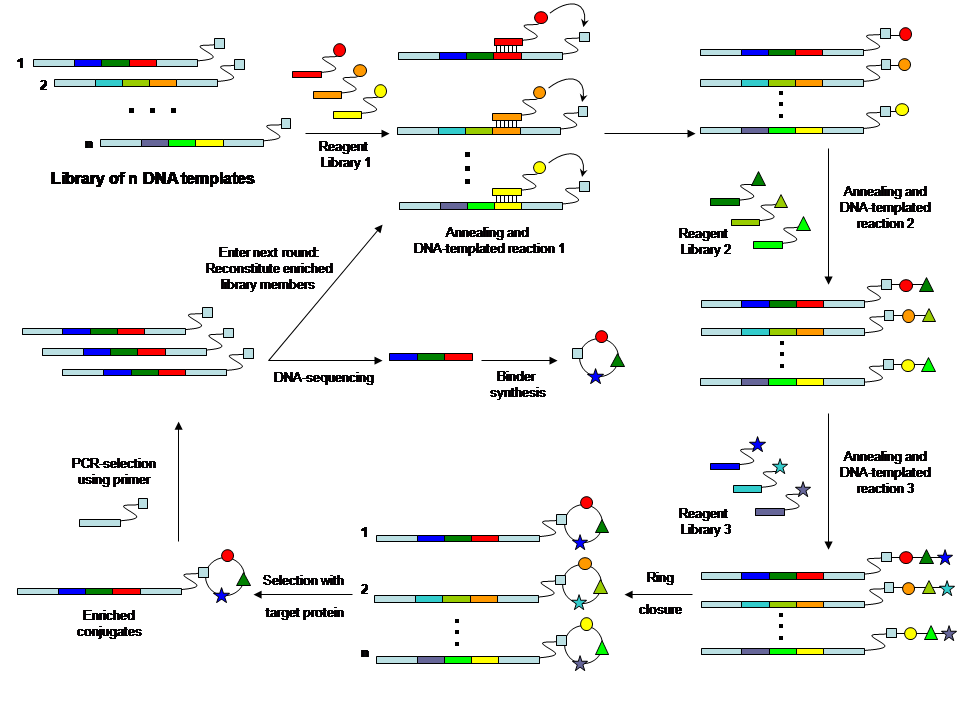
Fig. 2 DNA-encoded library by ‘DNA-templated synthesis’A library of oligonucleotides (i.e. 64 different oligonucleotides) containing three coding regions was hybridized to a library of reagent compound-oligonucleotide conjugates (i.e. 4 reagent oligonucleotide conjugates), able of pairing with the initial coding domain of the template oligonucleotide. After transferring of the compounds on the corresponding oligonucleotide template, the synthesis cycle was repeated the desired number of times with further sets of carrier compound-oligonucleotide conjugates (i.e. two rounds with four carrier compound-oligonucleotide conjugates per round). Subsequently, functional selection was performed and the sequence of the binding template amplified by PCR. Thus, DNA-sequencing allowed the identification of the binding molecule.

In 2001 David Liu and co-workers showed that complementary DNA oligonucleotides can be used to assist certain synthetic reactions, which do not efficiently take place in solution at low concentration. A DNA-heteroduplex was used to accelerate the reaction between chemical moieties displayed at the extremities of the two DNA strands. Furthermore, the "proximity effect", which accelerates bimolecular reaction, was shown to be distance-independent (at least within a distance of 30 nucleotides). In a sequence-programmed fashion oligonucleotides carrying one chemical reactant group were hybridized to complementary oligonucleotide derivatives carrying a different reactive chemical group. The proximity conferred by the DNA hybridization drastically increases the effective molarity of the reaction reagents attached to the oligonucleotides, enabling the desired reaction to occur even in an aqueous environment at concentrations which are several orders of magnitude lower than those needed for the corresponding conventional organic reaction not DNA-templated. Using a DNA-templated set-up and sequence-programmed synthesis Liu and co-workers generated a 64-member compound DNA encoded library of macrocycles.

== 3-Dimensional proximity-based technology (YoctoReactor technology) ==
The YoctoReactor (yR) is a 3D proximity-driven approach which exploits the self-assembling nature of DNA oligonucleotides into 3, 4 or 5-way junctions to direct small molecule synthesis at the center of the junction. Figure 5 illustrates the basic concept with a 4-way DNA junction.

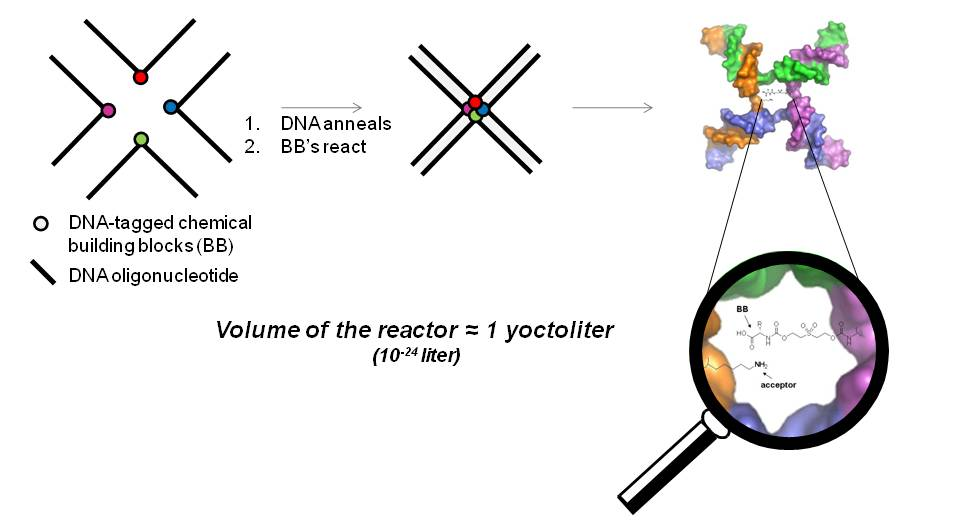
Fig. 5 Fundamental principle of the YoctoReactor. The center of 3, 4 and 5 way DNA junctions (a 4-way junction is shown here) becomes a yoctoliter-scale reactor where small molecule synthesis is facilitated in what has been termed the YoctoReactor (yR). Colored circles depict the chemical building blocks (BB) which are attached to carefully designed DNA oligonucleotides (black lines). Upon DNA annealing the BB are brought into proximity at the center of the DNA junction where they undergo chemical reaction.

The center of the DNA junction constitutes a volume on the order of a yoctoliter, hence the name YoctoReactor. This volume contains a single molecule reaction yielding reaction concentrations in the high mM range. The effective concentration facilitated by the DNA greatly accelerates chemical reactions that otherwise would not take place at the actual concentration several orders of magnitude lower.

=== Building a yR library ===
Figure 6 illustrates the generation of a yR library using a 3-way DNA junction.

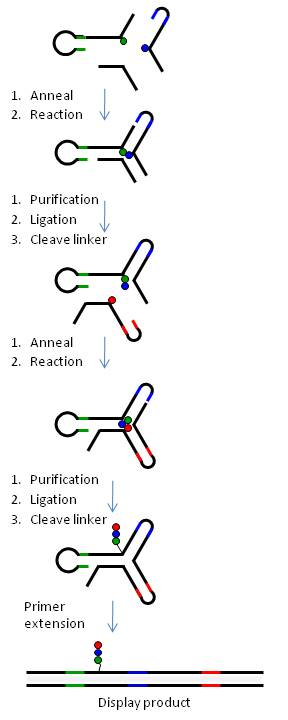
Fig. 6 YoctoReactor library assembly. Stepwise assembly of a DEL library using YoctoReactor technology. A 3-way reactor is shown here. (a) Position 1 (P1) and P2 BB are brought into proximity and undergo a chemical reaction in the presence of a helper oligonucleotide in P3. (b) The structure is purified by polyacrylamide gel electrophoresis (PAGE), the P1 and P2 DNA is ligated and the P2 linker is cleaved. (c) P3 BB is annealed to the P1-P2 ligation product from step b, and a chemical reaction between P2 and P3 BBs takes place. (d) The reaction product is purified by PAGE, the DNA is ligated and P3 linker is cleaved yielding a compound (OOO) covalently attached to the folded yR. (e) The yR is dismantled by primer extension yielding a double-stranded display product exposing the reaction product for selection and molecular evolution.

In summary, chemical building-blocks (BB) are attached via cleavable or non-cleavable linkers to three types of bispecific DNA oligonucleotides (oligo-BBs) representing each arm of the yR. To facilitate synthesis in a combinatorial manner, the oligo-BBs are designed such that the DNA contains (a) the code for an attached BB at the distal end of the oligo (colored lines) and (b) areas of constant DNA sequence (black lines) to bring about the self-assembly of the DNA into a 3-way junction (independently of the BB) and the subsequent chemical reaction. Chemical reactions are performed via a stepwise procedure and after each step the DNA is ligated and the product purified by polyacrylamide gel electrophoresis. Cleavable linkers (BB-DNA) are used for all but one position yielding a library of small molecules with a single covalent link to the DNA code. Table 1 outlines how libraries of different sizes can be generated using yR technology.

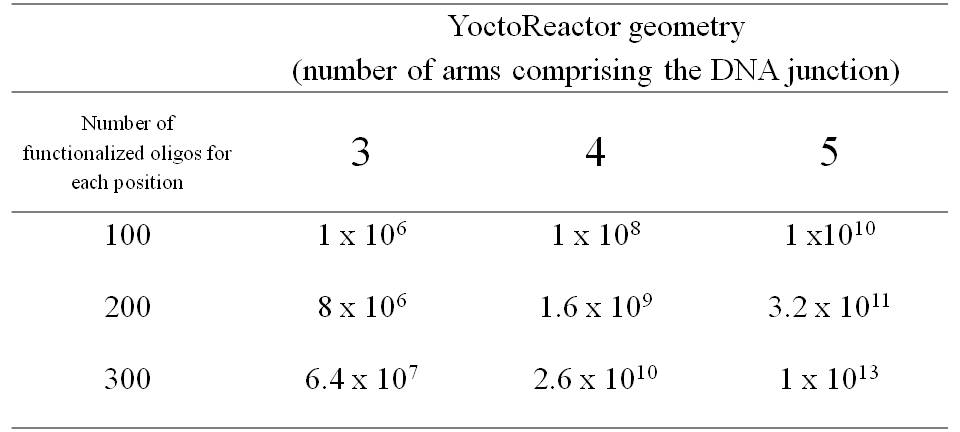
Table 1. YoctoReactor library size. yR library size is a function of the number of different functionalized oligos used in each position and the number of positions in the DNA junction

The yR design approach provides an unvarying reaction site with regard to both (a) distance between reactants and (b) sequence environment surrounding the reaction site. Furthermore, the intimate connection between the code and the BB on the oligo-BB moieties which are mixed combinatorially in a single pot confers a high fidelity to the encoding of the library. The code of the synthesized products, furthermore, is not preset, but rather is assembled combinatorially and synthesized in synchronicity with the innate product.

=== Homogeneous screening of yoctoreactor libraries ===
A homogeneous method for screening yoctoreactor libraries (yR) has recently been developed which uses water-in-oil emulsion technology to isolate individual ligand-target complexes. Called Binder Trap Enrichment (BTE), ligands to a protein target are identified by trapping binding pairs (DNA-labelled protein target and yR ligand) in emulsion droplets during dissociation dominated kinetics. Once trapped, the target and ligand DNA are joined by ligation, thus preserving the binding information.

Hereafter, identification of hits is essentially a counting exercise: information on binding events is deciphered by sequencing and counting the joined DNA - selective binders are counted with a much higher frequency than random binders. This is possible because random trapping of target and ligand is "diluted" by the high number of water droplets in the emulsion. The low noise and background signal characteristic of BTE is attributed to the "dilution" of the random signal, the lack of surface artifacts and the high fidelity of the yR library and screening method. Screening is performed in a single tube method. Biologically active hits are identified in a single round of BTE characterized by a low false positive rate.

BTE mimics the non-equilibrium nature of in vivo ligand-target interactions and offers the unique possibility to screen for target specific ligands based on ligand-target residence time because the emulsion, which traps the binding complex, is formed during a dynamic dissociation phase.

=== Screening of DELs in cells ===
DNA-encoded libraries (DELs) have been adapted for screening in living cells to better reflect native biological conditions, specifically using Xenopus laevis oocytes. This approach, termed cellular Binder Trap Enrichment (cBTE), facilitates the identification of small-molecule ligands that bind to target proteins in a native cellular environment.

In this method, the protein of interest (POI) is expressed in oocytes as a fusion with a "Prey" protein, such as carbonic anhydrase IX (CAIX). Simultaneously, a "Bait" molecule—comprising a known ligand for the Prey protein linked to a DNA strand—is introduced. Alongside the Bait, a DEL is co-injected into the oocytes. If a DEL member binds to the POI, it brings its attached DNA tag into the same molecular complex as the Bait DNA via the POI–Prey–Bait interaction.

Following incubation, the oocytes are lysed, and the lysate is subjected to Binder Trap Enrichment (BTE) as described above. In essence, the DEL and Bait DNA are ligated in droplets, thus encoding the binding event. The ligated DNA is then amplified and subjected to high-throughput sequencing to identify the DEL members that interacted with the POI.

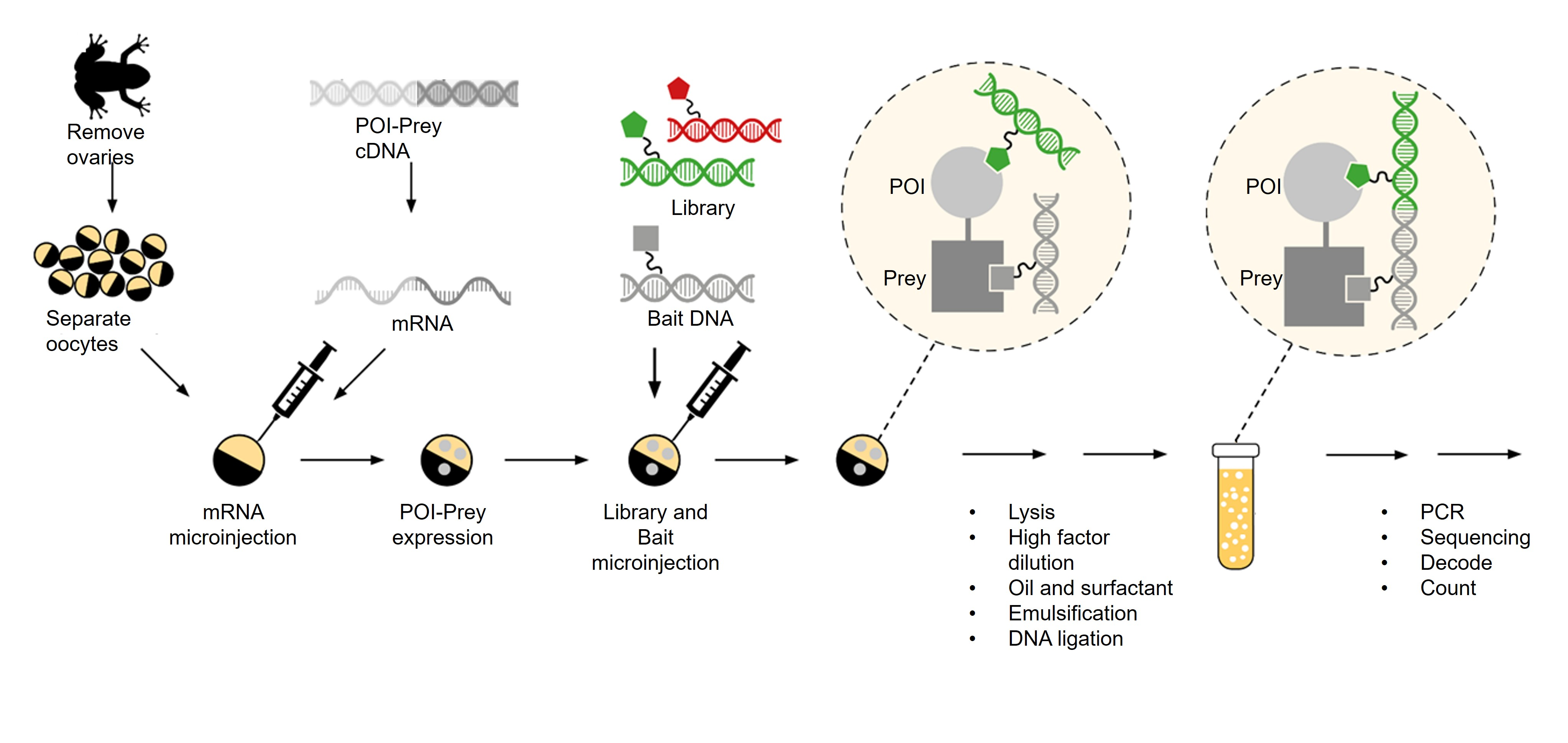
DELs in cells: mRNA encoding the target fused to a small protein, the Prey is injected into Xenopus oocytes. After expression, library and Bait DNA is injected into the cell for binding. Then, the cell is lysed, the contents diluted, oil and surfactant added, and an emulsion formed. Bound library members and Bait will be trapped together in the droplets in the emulsion, whereas unbound library members will only be trapped together with Bait by chance. The binding event is then encoded by ligation of the Bait DNA to the library DNA, and subsequently, the ligated DNA is sequenced, allowing identification of library molecules binding the target.

This intracellular screening technique allows for the discovery of ligands that engage targets in their native conformation and cellular environment, enabling screening of targets that are difficult to express or purify, and potentially improving the physiological relevance of identified compounds.

== Decoding of DNA-encoded chemical libraries ==
Following selection from DNA-encoded chemical libraries, the decoding strategy for the fast and efficient identification of the specific binding compounds is crucial for the further development of the DEL technology. So far, Sanger-sequencing-based decoding, microarray-based methodology and high-throughput sequencing techniques represented the main methodologies for the decoding of DNA-encoded library selections.

=== Sanger sequencing-based decoding ===
Although many authors implicitly envisaged a traditional Sanger sequencing-based decoding, the number of codes to sequence simply according to the complexity of the library is definitely an unrealistic task for a traditional Sanger sequencing approach. Nevertheless, the implementation of Sanger sequencing for decoding DNA-encoded chemical libraries in high-throughput fashion was the first to be described. After selection and PCR amplification of the DNA-tags of the library compounds, concatamers containing multiple coding sequences were generated and ligated into a vector. Following Sanger sequencing of a representative number of the resulting colonies revealed the frequencies of the codes present in the DNA-encoded library sample before and after selection.

=== Microarray-based decoding ===
A DNA microarray is a device for high-throughput investigations widely used in molecular biology and in medicine. It consists of an arrayed series of microscopic spots (‘features’ or ‘locations’) containing few picomoles of oligonucleotides carrying a specific DNA sequence. This can be a short section of a gene or other DNA element that are used as probes to hybridize a DNA or RNA sample under suitable conditions. Probe-target hybridization is usually detected and quantified by fluorescence-based detection of fluorophore-labeled targets to determine relative abundance of the target nucleic acid sequences. Microarray has been used for the successfully decoding of ESAC DNA-encoded libraries and PNA-encoded libraries. The coding oligonucleotides representing the individual chemical compounds in the library, are spotted and chemically linked onto the microarray slides, using a BioChip Arrayer robot. Subsequently, the oligonucleotide tags of the binding compounds isolated from the selection are PCR amplified using a fluorescent primer and hybridized onto the DNA-microarray slide. Afterwards, microarrays are analyzed using a laser scan and spot intensities detected and quantified. The enrichment of the preferential binding compounds is revealed comparing the spots intensity of the DNA-microarray slide before and after selection.

=== Decoding by high throughput sequencing ===
According to the complexity of the DNA encoded chemical library (typically between 10^{3} and 10^{6} members), a conventional Sanger sequencing based decoding is unlikely to be usable in practice, due both to the high cost per base for the sequencing and to the tedious procedure involved. High throughput sequencing technologies exploited strategies that parallelize the sequencing process displacing the use of capillary electrophoresis and producing thousands or millions of sequences at once. In 2008 was described the first implementation of a high-throughput sequencing technique originally developed for genome sequencing (i.e. "454 technology") to the fast and efficient decoding of a DNA encoded chemical library comprising 4000 compounds. This study led to the identification of novel chemical compounds with submicromolar dissociation constants towards streptavidin and definitely shown the feasibility to construct, perform selections and decode DNA-encoded libraries containing millions of chemical compounds. Now decoding of DNA-encoded libraries using commercial next-generation DNA sequencing platforms (e.g. Illumina) is the standard approach.

== Alternative barcodes to DNA ==
DNA barcodes can have limitations. Many standard chemical reactions can degrade DNA and thus compromise the chemical barcodes, necessitating changing chemical reaction conditions that could alter the binding ability of the small molecule to its target. Additionally, the DNA tag is typically over 50 times larger than the molecule itself, potentially restricting the binding ability of each library member and sometimes interacting with the target itself, creating false hits or obscuring potentially otherwise strong binders. This is especially problematic when the target has nucleic acid binding sites, like transcription factors or RNA-binding proteins. For this reason, a multitude of barcode alternatives have been developed in efforts to mitigate these issues such as abiotic peptides, peptide nucleic acids, and even barcode free self-encoded libraries.

=== Abiotic peptides ===
In contrast to DNA-encoded chemical libraries (DELS), abiotic peptide-encoded libraries (PELs) are emerging as an alternative in which synthetic peptide sequences are used as carriers of chemical information and small molecule discovery. Whereas DELs rely on nucleic acid tags and PCR amplification, PELs use non-natural amino acid sequences to store information which can be decoded by tandem mass spectrometry (MS/MS).

In a protein-encoded library system, small molecules are synthesized using a split-and-pool strategy while being covalently linked to a peptide tag that is elongated orthogonally to encode each split step. This results in a peptide sequence that functions as a molecular barcode for information storage, similar to how DNA functions in DELs. The use of non-natural amino acids with distinct mass spectrometry signatures allows for the store of sequence-defined information that can be decoded after affinity selection against protein targets.

The motivation behind the development of abiotic peptide encoding is the limited chemical reaction compatibility of DNA, which can degrade under various conditions. Since abiotic peptide encoding does not require DNA, these tags exhibit a greater library of molecules that can be synthesized and are also compatible with a broader range of chemical reactions.

Despite this work, PELs still has its limitations, as PEL library sizes are orders of magnitude smaller than current DELs. Additionally, PELs lack the inherent amplification capabilities of DELs and rely on current mass spectrometric analysis for decoding. Since peptide decoding requires complex mass spectrometry and computational power, this means that current detection sensitivity limits practical PEL sizes.

=== Peptide nucleic acid (PNA) encoded libraries ===
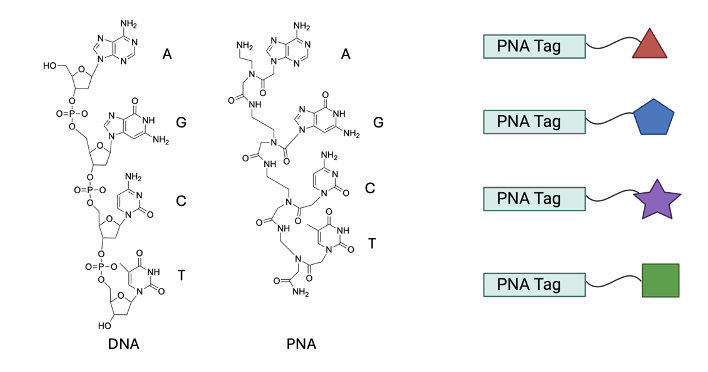
Comparison of DNA and peptide nucleic acid (PNA) structures (left) and schematic representation of PNA-encoded libraries with molecular tags (right).

Peptide nucleic acids (PNAs) are synthetic oligonucleotides in which the sugar-phosphate backbone of the DNA or RNA is replaced by a neutral N-(2-aminoethyl)-glycine peptide-like backbone. This allows PNAs to hybridize with complementary DNA or RNA with high affinity and specificity, maintaining their ability to be amplified via polymerase chain reaction (PCR). Unlike DNA/RNA, PNAs are able to resist degradation by nucleases and proteases.

In a PNA-encoded library system, unique PNA sequences serve as molecular tags that are covalently attached to small molecules that are produced using combinatorial methods that generate large collections of related compounds. These PNA tags act as barcodes that encode the identity of the PNA allowing for downstream identification.

PNA libraries are synthesized using solid-phase peptide synthesis (SPPS), allowing library assembly on resin similar to other peptide libraries. This contrasts with DNA-encoded libraries, which often require enzymatic ligation steps and can be limited by the chemical properties of DNA.

The neutrality and stability of the PNA backbone means that PNA tags can tolerate conditions that might degrade DNA tags, and the strong hybridization to complementary nucleic acids which allows PNA tags to be decoded wither by direct hybridization or by conversion into DNA, which can then be amplified and analyzed,<ref. PNA-encoded libraries have been used in several different formats, including microarray hybridization, selection against biological targets, and PCR-based decoding following selection.

=== Barcode-free hit discovery ===
Böcker, Pomplun, and colleagues developed a barcode-free hit discovery, wherein the small molecules serve as their own identifiers, acting as the ‘barcodes’ themselves. Known as the Self-Encoded Library (SEL) platform, this approach combines tandem mass spectrometry with custom software called COmbinatorial Mass Encoding Decoding Tool (COMET) for automated structure annotation. By removing the need for external tags, such as the bulky DNA sequences used in traditional DNA-encoded libraries (DELs), the platform eliminates potential interference with target binding and expands the range of compatible chemical reactions. The SEL platform enables direct screening of over half a million small molecules in a single experiment. This platform allowed scientists to identify binders for nucleic acid-binding targets like flap endonuclease 1 (FEN1), a DNA-processing enzyme overexpressed in multiple cancer types that was previously inaccessible to traditional DEL screenings. Furthermore, the platform democratizes drug discovery by utilizing standard mass spectrometry facilities and straightforward synthesis techniques that are accessible to smaller academic laboratories.

There are some limitations to the SEL platform. Firstly, there is low scaffold diversity within individual libraries, as the chemistry is limited to the structures compatible with the COMET software. Additionally, SEL hits cannot be amplified, so the amount of material for each potential hit must account for the sensitivity limits of the mass spectrometer. Moreover, manual analysis of the proposed candidates and their MS/MS spectra was still necessary to verify structures, which requires laborious technical analysis. To enable larger scale screenings, the software will require more advanced compound filtering and candidate ranking.

Overall, the system is intended to facilitate the identification of inhibitors for challenging enzymatic targets while reducing the amount of synthetic efforts required. Its potential applications include inhibitor discovery in both academic and industrial research settings.

== See also ==
- Drug discovery
- High-throughput screening
- Combinatorial chemistry
- DNA sequencing
- Phage display
