= Titanium biocompatibility =

Overview of titanium's biocompatible properties

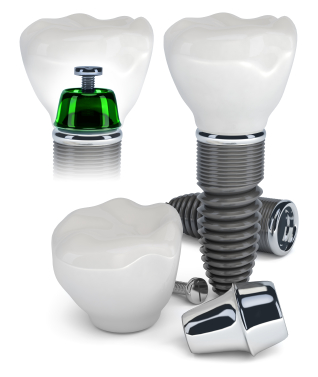
Titanium dental implants

Titanium was first introduced into surgeries in the 1950s after having been used in dentistry for a decade prior. It is now the metal of choice for prosthetics, internal fixation, inner body devices, and instrumentation. Titanium is used as a material for biomedical implants in neurosurgery, bone conduction hearing aids, false eye implants, spinal fusion cages, pacemakers, toe implants, and shoulder/elbow/hip/knee replacements along with many more. The main reason why titanium is often used in the body is due to titanium's biocompatibility and, with surface modifications, bioactive surface. The surface characteristics that affect biocompatibility are surface texture, steric hindrance, binding sites, and hydrophobicity (wetting). These characteristics are optimized to create an ideal cellular response. Importantly, patient condition can influence the type of modification necessary, for instance in patients with steatotic liver diseases other titanium surface modifications provide better outcomes as compared to patients without fatty liver disease. Some medical implants, as well as parts of surgical instruments are coated with titanium nitride (TiN).

== Biocompatibility ==
Titanium is considered the most biocompatible metal due to its resistance to corrosion from bodily fluids, bio-inertness, capacity for osseointegration, and high fatigue limit. Titanium's ability to withstand the harsh bodily environment is a result of the protective oxide film that forms naturally in the presence of oxygen. The oxide film is strongly adhered, insoluble, and chemically impermeable, preventing unfavorable reactions between the metal and the surrounding environment.

=== Osseointegration interaction and proliferation ===
==== High energy surfaces induce angiogenesis during osseointegration ====
It has been suggested that titanium's capacity for osseointegration stems from the high dielectric constant of its surface oxide, which does not denature proteins (like tantalum, and cobalt alloys). Its ability to physically bond with bone gives titanium an advantage over other materials that require the use of an adhesive to remain attached. Titanium implants last longer and much higher forces are required to break the bonds that join them to the body compared to their alternatives.

==== Surface properties determine osseointegration ====
The surface properties of a biomaterial play an important role in determining cellular response (cell adhesion and proliferation) to the material. Titanium's microstructure and high surface energy enable it to induce angiogenesis, which assists in the process of osseointegration.

== Surface energy ==
=== Redox potential ===
Titanium can have many different standard electrode potentials depending on its oxidation state. Solid titanium has a standard electrode potential of −1.63 V. Materials with a greater standard electrode potential are more easily reduced, making them better oxidizing agents. As can be seen in the table below, solid titanium prefers to undergo oxidation, making it a better reducing agent.

| Half reaction | Standard electrode potential (V) |
|---|---|
| Ti^{2+} + 2 e^{−} → Ti(s) | −1.63 |
| Ti^{3+} + 3 e^{−} → Ti(s) | −1.21 |
| TiO_{2} + 4 H^{+} + 4 e^{−} → Ti(s) + 2 H_{2}O | −0.86 |
| 2 TiO_{2}(s) + 2 H^{+} + 2 e^{−} → Ti_{2}O_{3}(s) + H_{2}O | −0.56 |
| Ti^{2+}(aq)/M^{3+}(aq) | −0.36 |

=== Surface coating ===
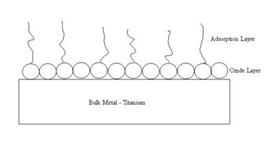
Cellular binding to a titanium oxide surface

Titanium naturally passivates, forming an oxide film that becomes heterogeneous and polarized as a function of exposure time to bodily environments. This leads to the increased adsorption of hydroxyl groups, lipoproteins, and glycolipids over time. The adsorption of these compounds changes how the material interacts with the body and can improve biocompatibility. In titanium alloys such as Ti-Zr and Ti-Nb, zirconium and niobium ions that are liberated due to corrosion are not released into the patient's body, but rather added to the passivation layer. The alloying elements in the passive layer add a degree of biocompatibility and corrosion resistance depending on the original alloy composition of the bulk metal prior to corrosion.

Protein surface concentration, ($\Gamma$), is defined by the equation

$\Gamma={Q_{\text{ADS}}M\over nF}$

where Q_{ADS} is the surface charge density in C⋅cm^{−2}, M is the molar mass of the protein in g⋅mol^{−1}, n is the number of electrons transferred (in this case, one electron for each protonated amino group in the protein), and F is the Faraday constant in C⋅mol^{−1}.

The equation for collision frequency is as follows:

$v_{\text{c}}={2\pi DcdN_{\text{A}}}$

where D = 8.83 × 10^{−7} cm^{2}⋅s^{−1} is the diffusion coefficient of the BSA molecule at 310 K, d = 7.2 nm is the "diameter" of the protein which is equivalent to twice the Stokes radius, N_{A} = 6.023 × 10^{23} mol^{−1} is the Avogadro constant, and c* = 0.23 g⋅L^{−1} (3.3 μM) is the critical bulk supersaturation concentration.

=== Wetting and solid surface ===
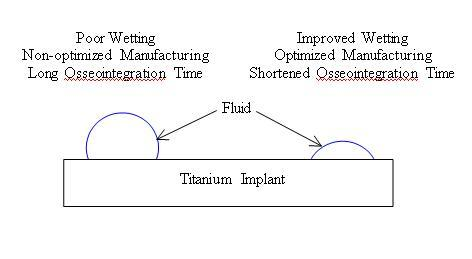
The droplet on the left has a contact angle between 90 and 180 degrees, rendering the interaction between the solid and the liquid relatively weak. In contrast, the droplet on the right has a contact angle between 0 and 90 degrees making the interaction between the solid and the liquid strong.

Wetting occurs as a function of two parameters: surface roughness and surface fraction. By increasing wetting, implants can decrease the time required for osseointegration by allowing cells to more readily bind to the surface of an implant. Wetting of titanium can be modified by optimizing process parameters such as temperature, time, and pressure (shown in table below). Titanium with stable oxide layers predominantly consisting of TiO_{2} result in improved wetting of the implant in contact with physiological fluid.

| Surface | Wetting angle (degrees) | Pressure (mbar) during processing | Temperature (degrees C) during processing | Other surface processing |
|---|---|---|---|---|
| Bare Ti | ~50 | - | - | None |
| TiO_{2} TiO Ti_{4}O_{7} TiO_{4} (Planar) | ~33 | 2.2 | 700 | Oxidation |
| TiO_{2} TiO Ti_{4}O_{7} (Planar) | ~45 | 4 | 700 | Oxidation |
| TiO_{2} TiO Ti_{4}O_{7} TiO_{4} (Hollow) | ~32 | 2.2 | 400 | Oxidation |
| TiO_{2} TiO Ti_{4}O_{7} (Hollow) | ~25 | 2.6 | 500 | Oxidation |
| TiO_{2} TiO Ti_{4}O_{7} (Hollow) | ~8 | 4 | 400 | Oxidation |
| TiO_{2} TiO Ti_{4}O_{7} (Hollow) | ~20 | 4 | 500 | Oxidation |
| Ti with roughened surface | 79.5 ± 4.6 | - | - | Machined surface |
| Ti with alkali-treated surface | 27.2 ± 6.9 | - | - | Bio-surface |

== Adsorption ==
=== Corrosion ===
Mechanical abrasion of the titanium oxide film leads to an increased rate of corrosion.

Titanium and its alloys are not immune to corrosion when in the human body. Titanium alloys are susceptible to hydrogen absorption which can induce precipitation of hydrides and cause embrittlement, leading to material failure. "Hydrogen embrittlement was observed as an in vivo mechanism of degradation under fretting-crevice corrosion conditions resulting in TiH formation, surface reaction and cracking inside Ti/Ti modular body tapers." Studying and testing titanium behavior in the body allow us to avoid malpractices that would cause a fatal breakdown in the implant, like the usage of dental products with high fluoride concentration or substances capable of lowering the pH of the media around the implant.

=== Adhesion ===
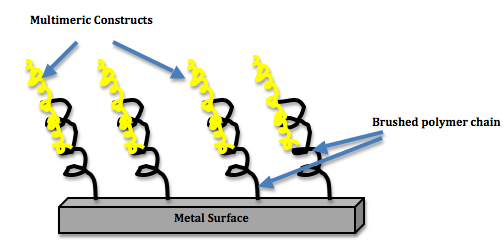
A metal surface with grafted polymers multimeric constructs to promote cell binding. The polymers grafted on the metal surface are brushed, increasing the contact area for cell integration

The cells at the implant interface are highly sensitive to foreign objects. When implants are installed into the body, the cells initiate an inflammatory response which could lead to encapsulation, impairing the functioning of the implanted device.

The ideal cell response to a bioactive surface is characterized by biomaterial stabilization and integration, as well as the reduction of potential bacterial infection sites on the surface. One example of biomaterial integration is a titanium implant with an engineered biointerface covered with biomimetic motifs. Surfaces with these biomimetic motifs have shown to enhance integrin binding and signaling and stem cell differentiation. Increasing the density of ligand clustering also increased integrin binding. A coating consisting of trimers and pentamers increased the bone-implant contact area by 75% when compared to the current clinical standard of uncoated titanium. This increase in area allows for increased cellular integration, and reduces rejection of implanted device. The Langmuir isotherm:

$\Gamma={B_{\text{ADS}}\Gamma_{\text{max}}\over (1+cB_{\text{ADS}})}$,

where c is the concentration of the adsorbate $\Gamma$ is the max amount of adsorbed protein, B_{ADS} is the affinity of the adsorbate molecules toward adsorption sites. The Langmuir isotherm can be linearized by rearranging the equation to,

${c\over\Gamma}={{1\over {B_{\text{ADS}}\Gamma_{\text{max}}}} + {c\over \Gamma_{\text{max}}}}$

This simulation is a good approximation of adsorption to a surface when compared to experimental values. The Langmuir isotherm for adsorption of elements onto the titanium surface can be determined by plotting the know parameters. An experiment of fibrinogen adsorption on a titanium surface "confirmed the applicability of the Langmuir isotherm in the description of adsorption of fibrinogen onto Ti surface."

== See also ==
- Biomaterials: mechanical properties
- Metals in medicine
- Titanium adhesive bonding
