= Titanium adhesive bonding =

Aerospace engineering process

Titanium adhesive bonding is an engineering process used in the aerospace industry, medical-device manufacture and elsewhere. Titanium alloy is often used in medical and military applications because of its strength, weight, and corrosion resistance characteristics. In implantable medical devices, titanium is used because of its biocompatibility and its passive, stable oxide layer. Also, titanium allergies are rare and in those cases mitigations like Parylene coating are used. In the aerospace industry titanium is often bonded to save cost, touch times, and the need for mechanical fasteners. In the past, Russian submarines' hulls were completely made of titanium because the non-magnetic nature of the material went undetected by the defense technology at that time. Bonding adhesive to titanium requires preparing the surface beforehand, and there is not a single solution for all applications. For example, etchant and chemical methods are not biocompatible and cannot be employed when the device will come into contact with blood and tissue. Mechanical surface roughness techniques like sanding and laser roughening may make the surface brittle and create micro-hardness regions that would not be suitable for cyclic loading found in military applications. Air oxidation at high temperatures will produce a crystalline oxide layer at a lower investment cost, but the increased temperatures can deform precision parts. The type of adhesive, thermosetting or thermoplastic, and curing methods are also factors in titanium bonding because of the adhesive's interaction with the treated oxide layer. Surface treatments can also be combined. For example, a grit blast process can be followed by a chemical etch and a primer application.

== Abrasives ==
Aluminium oxide or Alumina and Silicon carbide are most commonly used to prepare titanium for epoxy bonding. Alumina has a hardness of 9 on the Mohs scale while silicon carbide has a hardness of just under that of diamond. Alumina particle sizes in the 10 to 150 micron range are used depending on the workpiece geometry and blasting capabilities. Silicon carbide particles are typically in the 20 to 50 micron range with texturing occurring at a faster pace than alumina. When silicon carbide hits the titanium surface the operator will see sparks as is common with titanium surfaced golf drivers when they hit the ground surface. Care must be taken if sensitive electronic assemblies are housed within the titanium enclosure. Electrostatic discharge can be mitigated with point ionizers or grounding features in the tools. Glass beads media are used less commonly. They come as spherical particles in the 35-100 micron range. They are a 6 on the Mohs scale and are oftentimes used with water to create a hydrohone slurry. When applied to commercially pure titanium material they will stress relieve the assembly, typically after welding, and create a satin-like finish perfect for laser marking of labels. The surface is also suitable as preparation for assemblies prior to vapor deposition of Parylene coating.

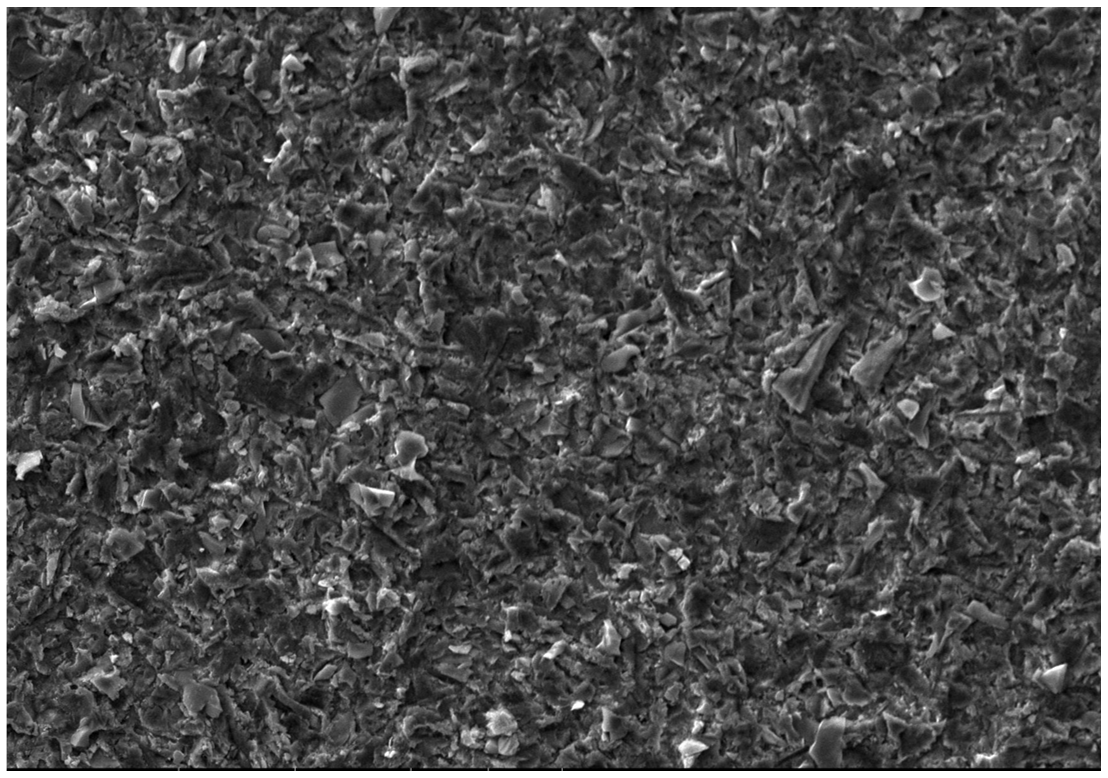
Silicon carbide grit blast on a commercially pure titanium sample - 500X magnification.

Surface roughness is achieved through the use of a blasting nozzle propelled by compressed air. The focus and velocity of the media created by the nozzle can be varied depending on the roughness requirements and repeatability. Surface roughness measured using Ra, Sa and Sdr is used to characterize the media application and the adhesive bonding strength. Typical Ra values for commercially pure titanium are between 0.2 and 0.75 micro meters. The surface roughness can be tailored to the epoxy viscosity and curing conversion. The roughened surface is rinsed with process water or an alkaline cleaner and is often sealed with a primer application like Silane A-187 or alkoxide. Application of the primer can be achieved through manual means, like a brush. It can also be sprayed on the roughened surface or the whole assembly can be dipped in a primer solution and cured. On commercially pure titanium surfaces that have been roughened with silicon carbide, a silane primer will darken the surface allowing for verification of application.

Implantable medical devices are often manufactured in a cleanroom environment. Typical cleanroom ratings are within the ISO-7 and ISO-8 range or between class 10k and 100k. Abrasives and their application cannot be housed in such cleanrooms. If pass through windows are not available then laser roughening is a good option.

== Laser roughening ==
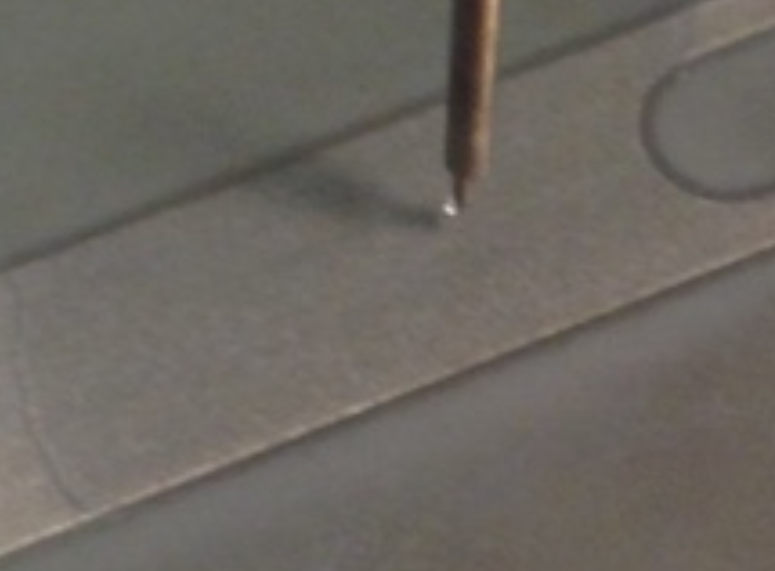
Grade 1 Ti Laser Roughened Contact Angle Measurement.

Laser roughening of titanium surfaces for epoxy bonding is a good option when abrasives and chemical agents are restricted in the manufacturing area. The process is also more repeatable and consistent than the often manual abrasive blasting. Other advantages over abrasives are touch time and maintenance. The drawback of laser roughening is the cost of the equipment and tooling. Also, the laser will heat the material depending on its power output and number of passes. It will remove material from the surface and create regions of hardened material that get relocated within the surface. Neodymium doped yttrium aluminum garnet (Nd:YAG), CO_{2,} green, femtosecond lasers can be used depending on the workpiece and adhesion requirements. YAG or fiber laser markers that anneal the titanium surface are the low cost solution while the femtosecond laser is on the high end of the cost scale. Surface roughness of laser roughened surfaces is best measured using a three-dimensional scanning laser microscope or a non-contact profilometer. XPS and SEM analysis of alloyed titanium, like grade 5, will show the segregation of the aluminum and vanadium. Oftentimes, the laser roughening is done in ambient conditions with or without argon shielding gas. Ambient elements that play no role in bonding like carbon and nitrogen can be ignored from the surface analysis. Laser roughening of grade 5 titanium will show that the vanadium will segregate to the bulk of the alloy and appear at the surface with an increased oxygen level. Lap shear tests have shown that this segregation does not affect surface adhesion. The increase of laser power has shown to increase oxidation of grade 5 titanium which has been correlated to increase bond strength. Also, producing alumina at the surface has shown to improve bonding. Dimples created by multiple laser pulses increase the surface area for adhesion, but the center of the topography will have reduced oxide formation because of the laser-induced plasma. Depending on the grade of titanium and the adhesive used, the laser parameters of power, frequency, and pattern can be tailored to the loading requirements and the aforementioned surface elemental beneficial conditions. Unwanted metal oxide can occur when higher laser powers and multiple passes are employed. These can be removed with a lower powered laser pass or a titanium brush, post roughening. The grain size will affect the surface roughness, hardness, and wettability of the surface. On grade 2 titanium, a smaller grain structure improved these surface prep characteristics. As with abrasives, a silane primer application is used to seal the laser roughened surface.

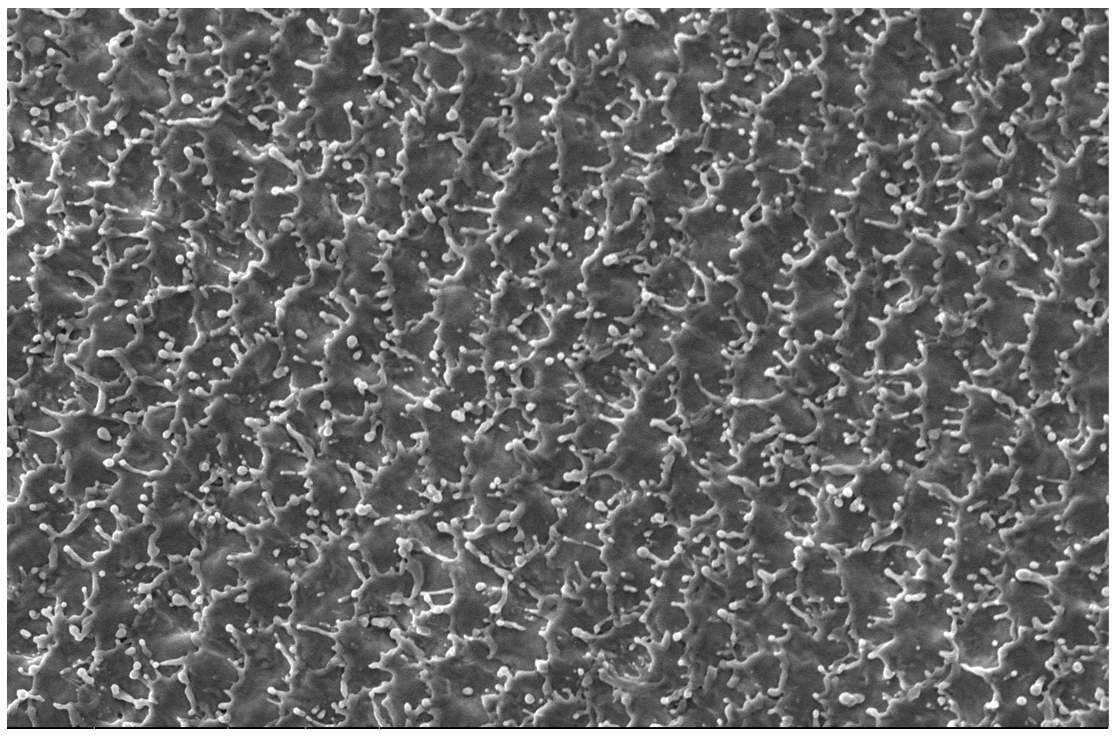
Commercially pure titanium roughened using a fiber laser .001 inch spacing, 100 inches/second speed - 500X magnification.

== Etchant, chemical and anodizing preparation ==
Prior to these treatments a solvent degreaser should be used with an alumina grit blast to remove unwanted oxides on the surface. A 1982 study at the Naval Air Development Center compared 11 etchant, chemical and anodizing preparations on grade 5 titanium samples. Once bonded, these samples were exposed to 56 days of 140 degrees F and 100% relative humidity. Crack growth was measured at preselected intervals. The results showed that chromic acid anodizing with fluoride, etchants Turco 5578, Pasa Jell 107C – hydrohone, Pasa Jell 107M – dry hone, Dapcotreat 4023/4000 and alkaline peroxide were superior to phosphate fluoride preparations.

Turco 5578-L is a commonly used etchant and alkaline cleaner for titanium. It is produced by Henkel Technologies and comes in a liquid form so concentrations can be easily modified. It is an anisotropic etchant that avoids hydrogen embrittlement. When used on Grade 5 titanium it will produce an oxide layer 17.5 nm thick and a surface roughness of 3.4 um total height profile (R_{t}).

In a chromic acid treatment the anodization is typically done at 5 or 10 volts. The 1982 study referred to above stated that the 5 volt performed better than the 10 volt as a function of average crack opening. In the Review of preparation for Ti, Critchlow and Brewis state that the 10 volt anodize showed better durability results. The 10 volt anodize can produce a columnar and cellular oxide layer with a thickness between 80 and 500 nm. The pores and whiskers produced can be penetrated by selecting a low viscosity adhesive, like a 3M 1838 epoxide resin or an Epo-Tek 301 epoxy. The surface oxide can be compromised if it is subjected to high temperatures, above 300 °C, and humidity prior to bonding.

Pasa Jell wet and dry hone are chemical etchants produced by Semco. They create oxide thicknesses of 10-20 nm. It is recommended to degrease the titanium surface and remove any corrosion by way of sanding and/or grit blasting prior to application. Typical application times are 10–15 minutes followed by a rinse with tap water. Application of a corrosion inhibiting primer like BR-127 has shown to produce adhesive joints comparable to ones produced by the chromic acid anodizing process.
