= Jenny Zhang (chemist) =

Australian chemist

- Born: Jenny Zhenqi Zhang
- Education: University of Sydney
- Awards: RSC Felix Franks Biotechnology Medal, 2020
- Scientific career
- Workplaces: University of Sydney; Hebrew University of Jerusalem; University of Cambridge
- Thesis: Enhancing the Tumour Penetration of Anti-Cancer Platinum Complexes (2011)
- Doctoral advisor: Trevor Hambley
- Website: www.ch.cam.ac.uk/group/zhang/person/jz366

Jenny Zhenqi Zhang is an Australian-British chemist and Biotechnology and Biological Sciences Research Council David Phillips Research Fellow of the Department of Chemistry, University of Cambridge, where she is also a Fellow of Corpus Christi College (2019-present). She was awarded the 2020 Royal Society of Chemistry Felix Franks Biotechnology Medal for her research into re-wiring photosynthesis to provide sustainable fuel sources.

== Early life and education ==
Zhang was born in China, and moved to Gosford, Australia at age eight. She credits her mother's stories explaining the scientific basis of various phenomena with stimulating her interest in science. She moved to Sydney to attend the University of Sydney, where she completed a Bachelor of Science (Advanced) in 2007 and a PhD in Chemistry under the supervision of Professor Trevor Hambley in 2011. During her PhD, Zhang also briefly worked at the Hebrew University of Jerusalem.

== Career and research ==
Zhang's doctoral research was in the area of bioinorganic chemistry, and she worked on the development of a platinum-based library of chemotherapeutic candidates featuring anthraquinone ligands and redox activity. This involved using a variety of imaging techniques (including those based on synchrotron radiation) to study the biological distributions and metabolism of the chemotherapeutics in 3D solid tumour models, and synthetic strategies to generate new examples of such complexes.

Zhang sought a change in research field following her PhD, and in 2013 she joined the group of Professor Erwin Reisner at the University of Cambridge as a postdoctoral fellow after receiving a Marie Skłodowska-Curie International Fellowship, also becoming a Research Associate of St John's College. This brought her into sustainability research, in particular artificial photosynthesis. Her postdoctoral research involved developing ways to wire oxidoreductases to electrodes and use photosynthesis to generate a sustainable biofuel, especially photosystem II.

In 2018, Zhang was awarded a BBSRC David Phillips Fellowship to start her own, independent research group in the Department of Chemistry at Cambridge. In her independent career, she has continued to work on the re-wiring of photosynthesis but now focuses on doing so in live cells. She also became a Fellow of Corpus Christi College, where she is now Director of Studies in Natural Sciences Chemistry. Zhang was recognised for her contributions to semi-artificial photosynthesis with the award of the Felix Franks Biotechnology Medal from the RSC in 2020.
