= Richard Haughton (disambiguation) =

Richard Haughton (born 1980) is an English rugby union footballer.

Richard Haughton may also refer to:

- Richard Brownrigg Haughton (1864–1929), American judge, 5th Commander-in-Chief of the Sons of Confederate Veterans
- Richard Haughton, editor of the Boston Atlas
- Richard Haughton of Joseph Beers v. Richard Haughton on List of United States Supreme Court cases, volume 34

== See also ==
- Richard Houghton (disambiguation)
