= Jennifer Zhang =

Chinese-American woodwind musician

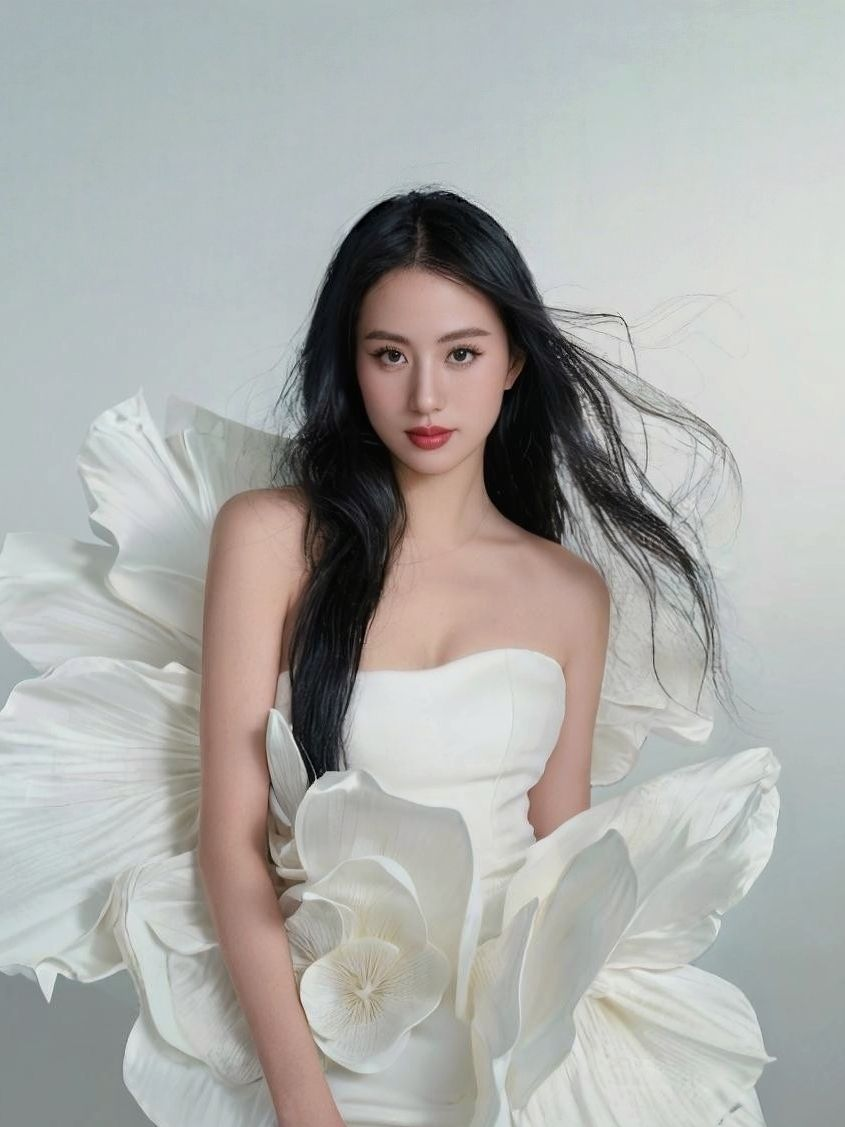
- Born: Shanghai, China
- Education: Northwestern University, Berklee School of Music, Central Conservatory of Music
- Occupation: Musician
- Website: Official website

Jennifer Zhang (張羽琪) is a Chinese-American woodwind musician. Crowned as the 2015 Miss Friendship Ambassador of Chicago, she was granted the honor of representing Chicago in the 2015 Miss Chinese International Pageant in Hong Kong. In 2017, she won the Miss China International crown in Beijing. In 2023 and 2024, she was recognized by Forbes as one of the 100 most influential in China.

== Education ==
Zhang graduated from the Northwestern University. She also attended the Berklee School of Music summer song-writing workshop and pursued non-degree studies from the Central Conservatory of Music in China.

== Talent ==
Zhang plays a variety of Chinese woodwind instruments such as the Chinese Transverse Bamboo Flute (Dizi), the Chinese Vertical Bamboo Flute (Xiao), the Chinese Bottle Gourd Silk (Hulusi), the Chinese Reed Flute (Bawu), as well as the Chinese Zither (Guzheng) and the piano.

== Career ==
Zhang is founder and president of Chicago-based Jeneration Capital investment firm. She was invited to New York for the Bloomberg Global Business Forum. In 2023, Zhang becomes the brand ambassador for Louis Klein. She was invited to walk on the runway on 2013 New York Fashion Week and 2023 Paris Fashion Week. She was also featured on a Manhattan billboard for her work. She was invited to represent Chinese Crisis Responder for the 2024 Lunar New Year parade in Chicago and was featured on CBS and WGN. In 2026, she performed along side Shin lim at the 43rd Annual Lunar New Year Celebration at McCormick Place hosted by Asian American Coalition of Chicago.

== Music ==
Zhang has created many original content including the following:

- On The Throne
- Flying High
- Foam of The Ocean

Zhang was invited to perform her new songs at Chicago's American Got Talent.

== Awards and Recognitions ==
- Best Asian Entertainer by 2021 Chicago Music Awards
- 2020 Global Clean Environment Awards
- 2020 Brilliant Miss World
- 2017 Miss China International
- 2015 Miss Friendship Ambassador of Chicago,
- 2023 Forbes China 100 Most Influential Chinese Selection
