= Richard A. Houghten =

Richard A. Houghten is a heterocyclic organic chemist and founder of the journal Peptide Research, which was later merged with the International Journal of Peptide and Protein Research, to become the Journal of Peptide Research. His work mainly concerns peptide activity and pharmacology. He is the founder and president of the Torrey Pines Institute for Molecular Studies (TPIMS), a biomedical research institute. Houghten pioneered the "tea-bag" approach of producing peptides for pharmacological work.

He is author of over five hundred scientific papers, 38 of which have been cited at least one hundred times. His h-index is over 60.

== Biography ==
Houghten received his PhD in organic chemistry from the University of California, Berkeley in 1975. He had previously received a BS in chemistry from California State University, Fresno and an M.S. in chemistry from Berkeley. He held a postdoctoral fellowship at the University of California, San Francisco, then an assistant professorship at Mount Sinai School of Medicine, City University of New York, and then joined the Scripps Research Institute, La Jolla, working with Richard Lerner. Houghten branched out to the business world in the 1980s, forming Multiple Peptide Systems in 1986, the Torrey Pines Institute for Molecular Studies (TPIMS) in 1988 and Houghten Pharmaceuticals, Inc. in 1990.

== Work in combinatorial biology ==
Combinatorial biology is the generation of large numbers of molecules (usually peptides, enzymes or other polypeptides in biology) with non-natural metabolic pathways. The resulting set of molecules is referred to as a library. Because traditional methods of chemical discovery and selection relied on "natural" pathways (those formed by sources found in the wild and brought into the library), creation of the requisite number of peptides for new drug discovery was impractical. New drugs needed to be built from specific combinations of proteins among the trillions of possible combinations. Synthetic avenues for peptide generation became an important venue for drug creation in the 1980s.

In 1985, Houghten's most cited paper (cited 650 times, according to Scopus) published his method for the synthesis of massive numbers of peptides—enough for practical use in pharmacological work—in the Proceedings of the National Academy of Sciences. This method was referred to as the "tea-bag" method because deprotected peptides are enclosed in mesh bags and dipped quickly into liquid solutions containing activated amino acids (or other organic compounds). The peptide is thus elongated one amino acid at each step, and by careful movement of each teabag, a series of related peptides can be made. By another variation, "split and mix", tens of millions of very diverse peptides can be made, and then assayed by some technique. Very precise deconvolution of the results, or alternatively, marking the peptide beads, can correlate sequence and activity. This allowed "[the capture of] information in a day that you couldn't get in a hundred years before" according to Houghten.

The problem of generating and sequencing large libraries of peptides suitable for pharmaceutical work remained. Selection and identification of specific desired molecular traits (e.g. antigen response, antimicrobial response) required a selection algorithm and process. In 1991, he and his colleagues published one of the major papers in combinatorial biology—the paper described a method to generate peptides capturable to contemporary protein microarrays through the creation of synthetic peptide combinatorial libraries (SPCL).

Houghten continued his work in combinatorial biology with an article in Methods, the journals section of Methods in Enzymology. which is the standard multi-volume references set for biochemical methodology in research.

== Awards ==
- Vincent du Vigneaud Award for Excellence in Peptide Science (2000)
- American Chemical Society's Ralph F. Hirschmann Award in Peptide Chemistry (2004)
- Bruce Merrifield Award (2005)
- Fellow of the American Association of Pharmaceutical Scientists (2006)
- Dan K. Richardson Entrepreneurship Program's 2011 Entrepreneur of the Year
