= Richard Holland (Parliamentarian) =

English politician

Richard Holland (died 1661) was an English politician who sat in the House of Commons between 1654 and 1656. He supported the Parliamentary cause in the English Civil War.

Holland was the eldest son of Edward Holland of Denton and was nephew of Richard Holland who was MP in 1586. He succeeded his father at Denton in 1630. In 1642 he was one of the commanders in the defence of Manchester against the Earl of Derby. He was a colonel in the service of the commonwealth and a firm adherent of Presbyterian party.

In 1654, Holland was elected Member of Parliament for Lancashire in the First Protectorate Parliament. He was re-elected MP Lancashire in 1656 for the Second Protectorate Parliament.

Holland died in 1661.

Holland left two daughters - Ann wife of Edward Kenyon of Prestwich and Frances who married Francis Beresford of Bentley.

Parliament of England
Preceded by William West; John Sawry; Robert Cunliffe	Member of Parliament for Lancashire; 1654–1656; With: Gilbert Ireland 1654–1656; Richard Standish 1654–1656; William Ashurst 1654; Sir Richard Hoghton, 3rd Baronet 1656	Succeeded by Sir George Booth Bt; Alexander Rigby
