= Edward Broughton (Royalist) =

Welsh soldier

Sir Edward Broughton
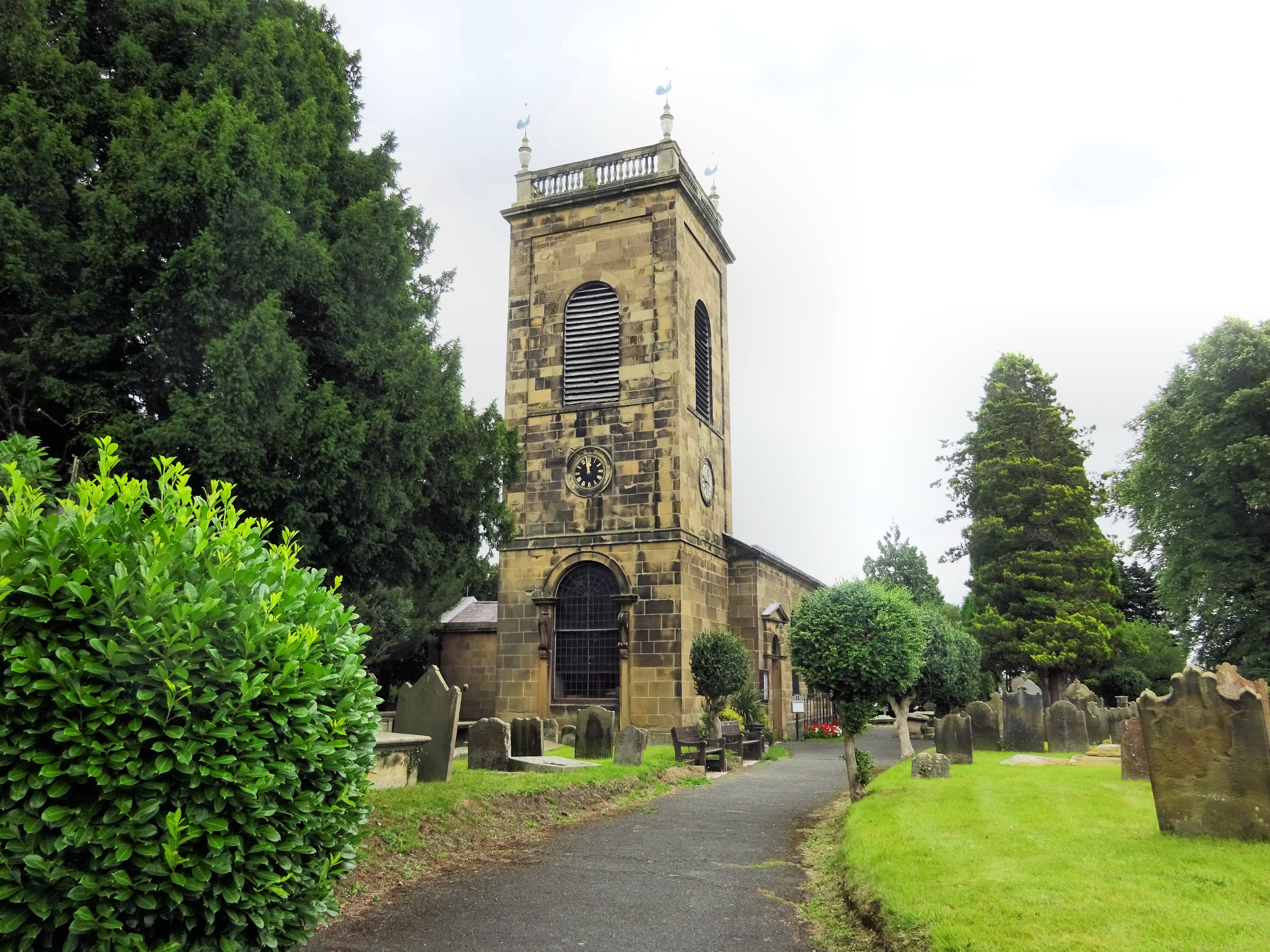
- Church of SS Marcella and Deiniol, Marchwiel; the parish church of the Broughton family
- Born: c. 1620; Marchwiel, Denbighshire, Wales
- Died: 20 June 1665 (aged 44–45)
- Burial place: Westminster Abbey
- Spouse(s): Alice Honeywood (d. bef. 1659); Mary Wyke
- Children: Edward (1661–1718)
- Military career
- Allegiance: Royalists
- Branch: Infantry
- Service years: 1641–1665
- Rank: Lieutenant-colonel
- Conflicts: Irish Confederate Wars; First English Civil War; Newark; Rowton Heath; Third English Civil War; Battle of Worcester; Booth's Uprising; Battle of Winnington Bridge; Second Anglo-Dutch War; Battle of Lowestoft †

Sir Edward Broughton (c. 1620 – 20 June 1665) was a Welsh landowner and soldier with a long service in Royalist armies during the Wars of the Three Kingdoms. Imprisoned in the Gatehouse Prison in Westminster in 1659 following a Royalist rebellion, he later married the prison keeper's widow and took on the lease of the prison himself.

Broughton was fatally wounded in the Battle of Lowestoft during the Second Anglo-Dutch War and was buried in Westminster Abbey. He was created a baronet the same year, although it is unclear if the legal process was complete at the time of his death.

== Early life ==
Edward Broughton was born in around 1620 into a gentry family, the Broughtons of Marchwiel, Denbighshire, with a tradition of military service in the Royal armies of England. The family probably originated in Cheshire; they first appear in Welsh records in the 16th century. Broughton's father, Sir Edward Broughton, was knighted in 1618. He was pardoned on his wife's petition for being accessory to murder in 1639. He was a Commissioner of Array for Denbighshire in 1642. Broughton's mother was Frances Tyrrell, daughter of Sir Edward Tyrrell and his second wife Margaret Egerton. At least two of Broughton's uncles and one brother were Royalist officers during the Civil War, while another brother, Francis, was said to have served as a captain in Parliament's army.

Holding the rank of captain, Broughton accompanied his uncle, the peripatetic professional soldier and Thirty Years' War veteran Colonel Robert Broughton, to Ireland in 1641 as part of Charles I's efforts to suppress a serious rebellion. Broughton remained in the country for 18 months, fighting in the subsequent Confederate War and returning with the rank of major.

== English Civil War ==
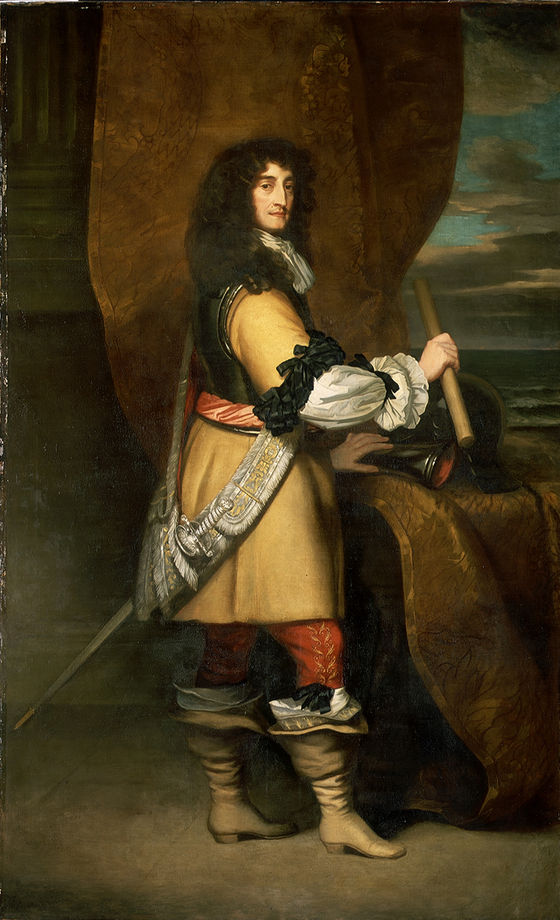
Prince Rupert of the Rhine. Broughton served under Rupert in 1644-5

Embroiled in a political crisis, Charles opened hostilities against the Parliament of England in August 1642 and on his return to England, Broughton joined a new Royalist regiment of foot being formed by Sir Michael Woodhouse in Shropshire. In October 1643 he took part in an attack on the Parliamentarian garrison at Wem, where he was wounded. It is possible that later the same month he was one of "two sons" of Sir Edward kidnapped alongside him from Marchwiel by the local Parliamentarian commander, Sir Thomas Myddelton.

By Spring 1644 Broughton was serving under Prince Rupert, and appears to have been captured at Rowton Heath in September 1645. The war ended in 1646 with Royalist defeat, but Broughton continued to be known to the government as an active and committed Royalist supporter; he was fined £180 in 1650 and in 1651 was ordered to be investigated further as a "bloody delinquent".

Later in 1651, given a lieutenant-colonel's commission, he joined Charles II's attempt to reclaim the throne in the Third English Civil War and was captured at Worcester. Imprisoned in the Tower of London, his case was considered serious enough for a treason charge as "an example of justice", but he was eventually released on parole.

== Exile and Booth's Uprising ==
On his release, Broughton joined other Royalist exiles on the Continent. Elements of the exiled Royalist army fought in Spanish service during the Anglo-Spanish War; Broughton may have served in Flanders as part of a force under James, Duke of York.

Broughton returned to England prior to 1659, when he took part in Booth's Uprising, an unsuccessful Royalist rebellion that August in Cheshire and North Wales: his former kidnapper Sir Thomas Myddelton also joined the rebels. As one of the more experienced rebel officers he was given command of the infantry at the Battle of Winnington Bridge; the rebels were routed, but along with others from the North Wales contingent Broughton escaped to Myddelton's home at Chirk Castle. Chirk surrendered to Parliamentarian general John Lambert at the end of the month but Lambert specifically excluded Broughton from the articles of surrender, likely due to his previous activities.

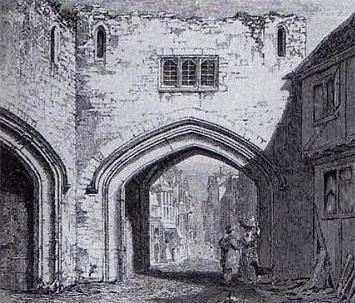
Gatehouse Prison, Westminster; Broughton went from being a prisoner here in 1659 to holding its lease, on marrying the former keeper's widow

Broughton was now in danger; a contemporary wrote it was feared "he will lose his life on account of having broken a former parole". He was moved from Chester to the Gatehouse Prison in London, but ongoing political instability in England meant that the main participants in Booth's uprising were not brought to trial before the Restoration brought Charles II back to power in 1660.

In the interim Broughton instead spent his time courting Mary Wyke, the widow of the prison's keeper; she only agreed to marry him if he swore an "imprecation" to prove his sincerity. In it, he called down vengeance on himself and his "posterity" if he did not "utterly forebear all rash swearing and all manner of drinking and all manner of debauchery [...] or if ever I am guilty of finding fault with any thing my intended wife shall doe or say". The text of Broughton's "imprecation" later became moderately famous, being printed in Thomas Pennant's Tours in Wales and elsewhere. The local historian A. N. Palmer noted that on reading it "one can easily guess what sort of man Edward Broughton was".

Broughton married Wyke on his release. It was his second marriage, his first wife having been Alice Honeywood, sister of Sir Robert Honywood. A son, Edward, was born in 1661; they also had two other sons who died young. The younger Edward died without issue in 1718, and his estates passed to a grandson of Mary Wyke and her first husband.

== Later life and death ==
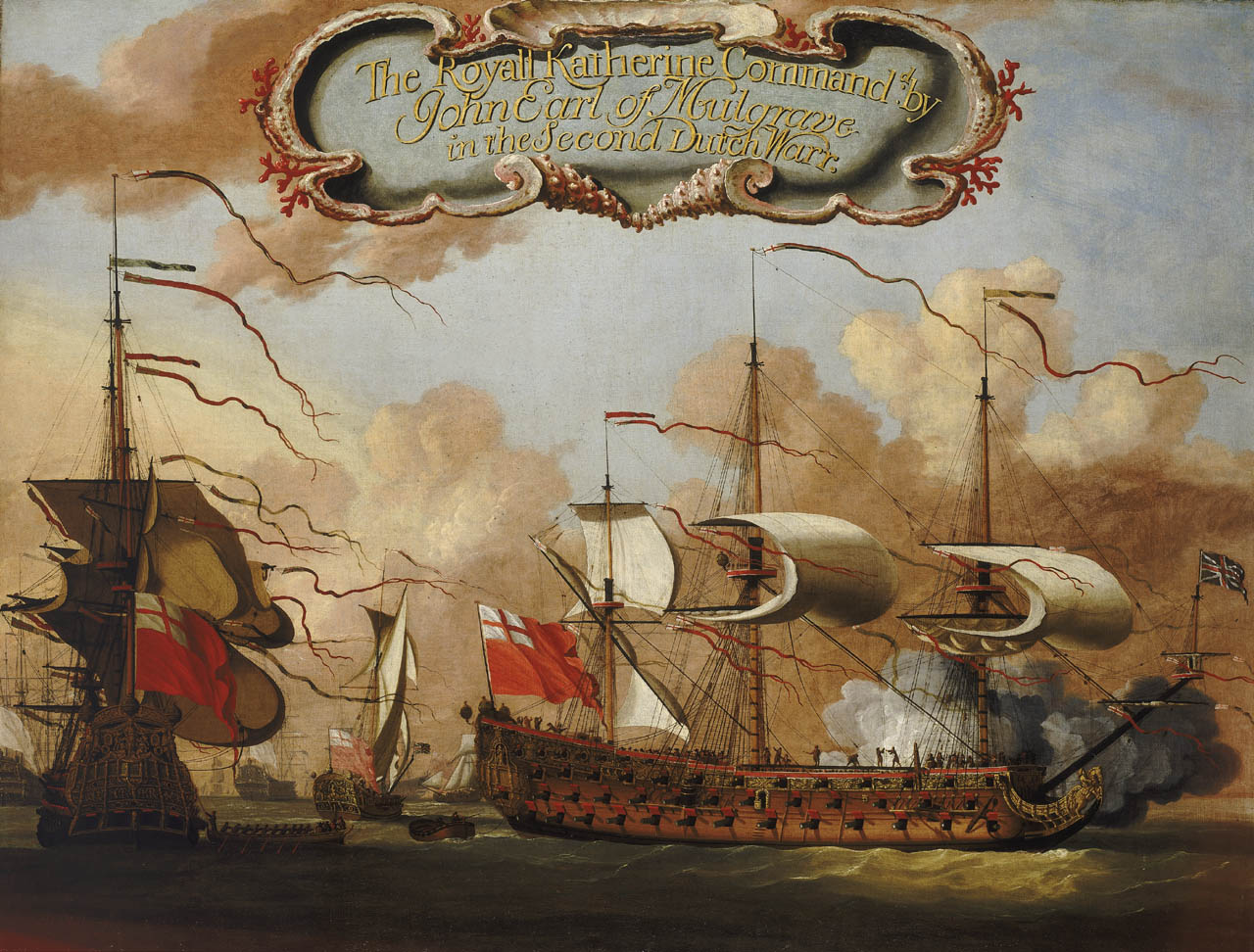
The Royal Katherine; Broughton was fatally wounded while leading a detachment of the Foot Guards serving on board in 1665.

Broughton's marriage gave him access to the lucrative revenues of the Wykes' lease on the Gatehouse, and he continued living there during the 1660s. Following the outbreak of the Second Anglo-Dutch War in 1665, Broughton served in the 1st Regiment of Foot Guards, being given command of a company drafted to serve as "sea-soldiers" on board the fleet. Broughton's company embarked on the Royal Katherine on 28 March.

At the beginning of June the English fleet, under the Duke of York, attacked the Dutch Republic fleet under Jacob van Wassenaer Obdam in the Battle of Lowestoft. The Royal Katherine was engaged by the Dutch ship Orange, whose crew made several boarding attempts which the Guards successfully repelled; Broughton however was fatally wounded, surviving long enough to die at home on 20 June. He was buried in the north transept of Westminster Abbey. His contemporary David Lloyd wrote that "he valiantly lost his life, scorning to fall though in effect killed, and in his stubborn way blundring out Commands when he could not speak them".

Broughton was knighted in, or before, 1664. He also appears to have been created a baronet but died before the award could be formally completed. The title was nevertheless used in legal documents and assumed by his only surviving son Edward (1651–1718), who inherited Broughton's estate at Marchwiel and Abenbury.

== Sources ==
- Dodd, A. H. (1959). "BROUGHTON family of Marchwiel, Denbighshire". Dictionary of Welsh Biography. National Library of Wales.
- Hamilton, Sir Frederick (1874). The Origin and History of the First Or Grenadier Guards, vol I. J. Murray.
- Newman, P.R. (1993). The Old Service: Royalist Regimental Colonels and the Civil War, 1642–46. Manchester University Press.
- Palmer, Alfred N. (1900). "The Broughtons of Marchwiel". Y Cymmrodor. 14.
- Tucker, Norman (1961). Royalist Officers of North Wales, 1642–1660; A Provisional List. Gee & Son.
- Tucker, Norman (1964). Denbighshire Officers in the Civil War. Gee & Son.
