= Robert Cunliffe (MP) =

English politician

Robert Cunliffe (died 4 December 1653) was an English politician who sat in the House of Commons in 1653.

Cunliffe was of Sparth in Clayton in the Moors, Lancashire and was an active parliamentarian. He was one of commissioners for sequestration for Lancashire in 1643 . In 1653, he was nominated as Member of Parliament for Lancashire in the Barebones Parliament. He died eight days before the dissolution of the parliament in 1653.

His only daughter married John Grimshaw son of John Grimshaw of Glayton Hall.

Parliament of England
Preceded by Ralph Ashton; Sir Richard Hoghton, 3rd Baronet	Member of Parliament for Lancashire; 1653; With: William West; John Sawry	Succeeded by Richard Holland; Gilbert Ireland; Richard Standish; William Ashurst
