= Thomas Standish =

English politician

Thomas Standish (c. 1593 – October 1642) of Duxbury Hall, Lancashire was an English politician who sat in the House of Commons between 1640 and 1642. Standish was a zealous Parliamentarian.

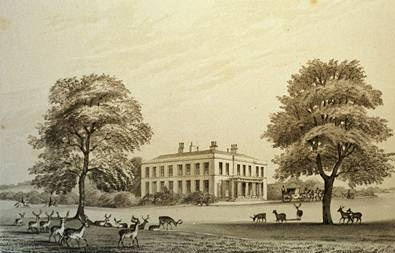
Duxbury Hall, Lancashire, in 1840

Standish was the son of Alexander Standish of Duxbury, educated at Queens' College, Cambridge and trained in law at Gray's Inn. He inherited the family manors of Duxbury and Duxbury Hall in 1622, on the death of his father.

He served as Prothonotary clerk of Common Bench for the Duchy of Lancaster from 1608 to 1635. During that time he was elected MP for Liverpool in 1626.

In April 1640, he was elected member of parliament for Preston in the Short Parliament. He was re-elected in November 1640 and sat in the Long Parliament until his death in 1642.

Standish died at the age of 49 and was buried at Chorley chapel. He had married twice; firstly Anne Wingfield, daughter of Sir Thomas Wingfield of Letheringham, Suffolk, with whom he had three sons and two daughters and secondly Anne, the daughter of Christopher Whittingham, of London and Suffolk, with whom he had a further three sons and three daughters. His eldest son, Thomas supported the king's side in the Civil War and was killed in September 1642 while taking part in the attack on Manchester. Standish was succeeded in turn by younger sons: Alexander, a Roundhead colonel who died in 1648 and Richard, MP for Lancashire and Preston, whose son and heir Richard was created a baronet in 1677.

Parliament of England
Parliament suspended since 1629	Member of Parliament for Preston; 1640–1642; With: Richard Shuttleworth	Succeeded by Richard Shuttleworth; William Langton
