= William Langton (disambiguation) =

William Langton (died 1279) was a medieval archbishop-elect of York.

William Langton may also refer to:

- William Langton (died 1221), Abbot of Shrewsbury
- William Langton (MP) (died 1659), English lawyer and politician
- William Langton (banker) (1803–1881), English financier and antiquarian
- William Langton (priest), Dean of Clogher, 1743–1761
- William Gore-Langton (1760–1847), British politician
- William Gore-Langton (1824–1873), British politician
- William Temple-Gore-Langton, 4th Earl Temple of Stowe (1847–1904), British politician
