= Frances Tyrrell =

Seventeenth-century English courtier

Frances Tyrrell was a seventeenth-century English courtier.

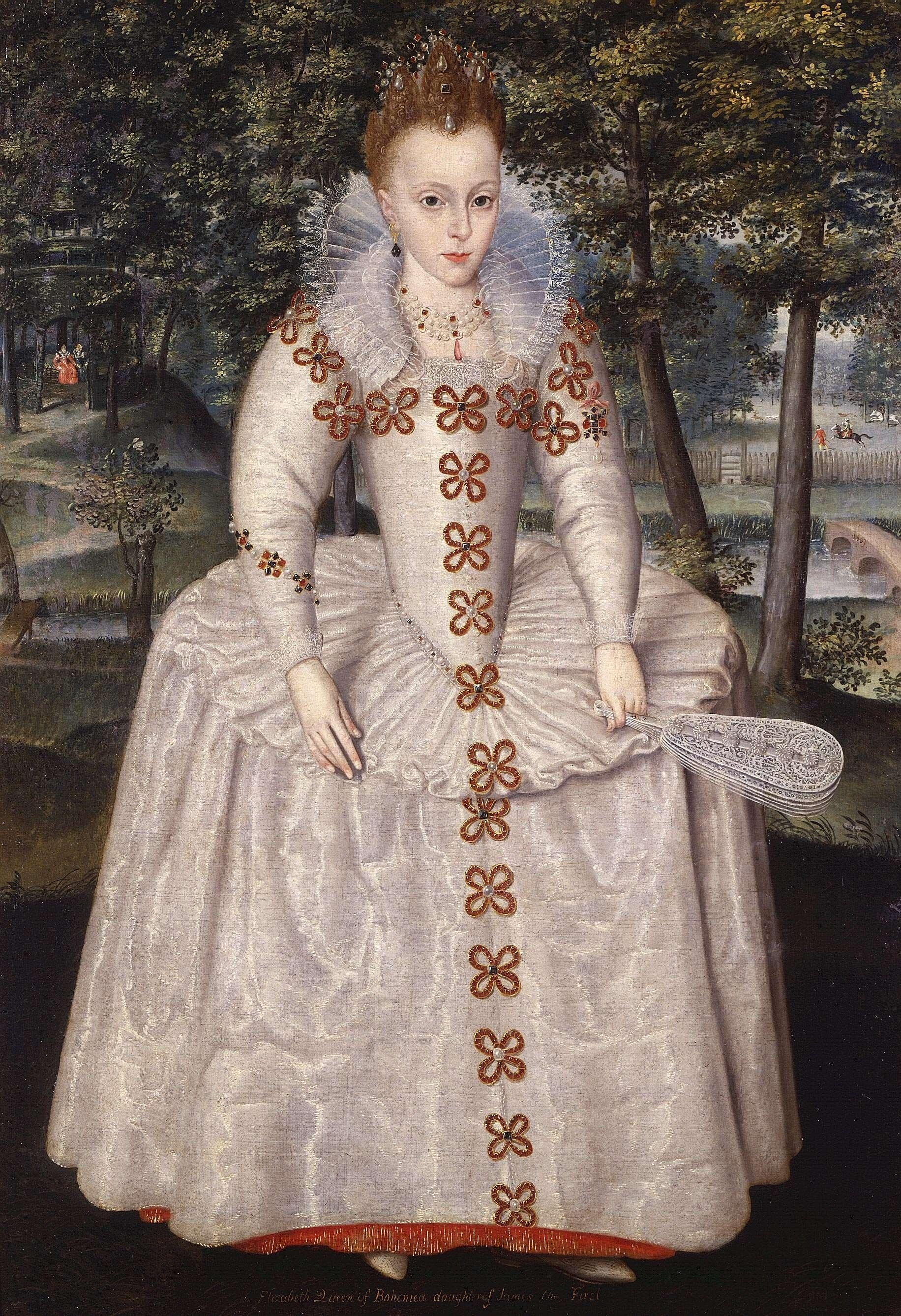
In 1615 Princess Elizabeth gave Frances Tyrrell a set of ruby buttons, possibly depicted in this portrait by Robert Peake, National Maritime Museum

She was a daughter of Edward Tyrrell of Thornton and Margaret, daughter of John Aston, and widow of Thomas Egerton of Walgrave. Her sister Bridget married the author William Sanderson or Saunderson.

She was brought up in the household of Princess Elizabeth, daughter of James VI and I and Anne of Denmark. She was connected to the Harington family, who had charge of the Princess at Coombe Abbey particularly through her uncle Sir Charles Montagu. After Elizabeth married Frederick V of the Palatinate in 1613, she went with them to Heidelberg.

Tyrrell left Elizabeth's service in 1615 and travelled to London. King James discovered that she had a set of 22 ruby studded buttons which Elizabeth had given to her, and made enquiries. Elizabeth explained in a letter to Ralph Winwood that she had given Tyrrell the buttons in recompense for her service. They had been a gift to her from Anne of Denmark at York in 1603, in exchange for a chain of pearls that her father had sent. Elizabeth thought the ruby buttons were worth £300, and she offered to take the buttons back and give Tyrrell the money instead. George Calvert brought the buttons back to Heidelberg. These were perhaps the ruby flowers or knots depicted on Elizabeth's portrait by Robert Peake.

The rubies may have belonged to Mary, Queen of Scots, who had a set of 24 ruby and diamond rose buttons as a girl in France, and another set of 71 ruby buttons of two sizes. Both sets of buttons were in Edinburgh Castle in 1579.

== Marriage and family ==
Frances Tyrrell married Edward Broughton of Marchweil near Wrexham. They remained in touch with Elizabeth and her lady-in-waiting Elizabeth Dudley, Countess of Löwenstein. The Countess of Löwenstein assured them that Elizabeth of Bohemia "will never doubt the affection of the worthy Welsh men for she knows they are honest and Brave Men". The Countess apologised for not visiting her at Marchweil in 1632, and Elizabeth wrote that she chided her for the omission. In June 1633 Lady Broughton suggested sending her sister to serve Elizabeth, but Elizabeth declined.

Their eight children included:

- Edward Broughton (died 1665)
