= William Ashurst (Roundhead) =

English politician

William Ashurst (1607–1656) of Ashurst's Hall, Dalton, Lancashire was an English politician who sat in the House of Commons at various times between 1649 and 1654. He fought in the Parliamentarian army in the English Civil War.

Ashurst was the son of Henry Ashurst of Ashurst's Hall, where his ancestors were seated after the Norman conquest. His brothers included Henry Ashurst, a successful London merchant and John Ashurst, a Parliamentarian lieutenant-colonel and Governor of Liverpool.

In November 1640, Ashurst was elected Member of Parliament for Newton in the Long Parliament. He was a major in the parliamentary army and a zealous puritan. In 1654 he was elected MP for Lancashire in the First Protectorate Parliament.

He married Dorothy Ellis and had a son Thomas.

Parliament of England
Preceded by Sir Richard Wynn, 2nd Baronet; William Sherman	Member of Parliament for Newton; 1640–1653; With: Peter Legh 1640–1642; Sir Roger Palmer 1642–1644; Peter Brooke 1645–1648	Succeeded by Not represented in Barebones Parliament
Preceded by William West; John Sawry; Robert Cunliffe	Member of Parliament for Lancashire; 1654; With: Gilbert Ireland; Richard Standish; Richard Holland	Succeeded by Gilbert Ireland; Richard Standish; Richard Holland; Sir Richard Hoghton, 3rd Baronet
