= John Sawry =

John Sawry (died 1664) was an English politician who sat in the House of Commons in 1653.

Sawry was of Plumpton, Lancashire and was a colonel in the service of the Commonwealth. In 1653, he was nominated as Member of Parliament for Lancashire in the Barebones Parliament.

Parliament of England
Preceded by Ralph Ashton; Sir Richard Hoghton, 3rd Baronet	Member of Parliament for Lancashire; 1653; With: William West; Robert Cunliffe	Succeeded by Richard Holland; Gilbert Ireland; Richard Standish; William Ashurst
