= Booth's Uprising =

1659 uprising in England

- Part of the Wars of the Three Kingdoms
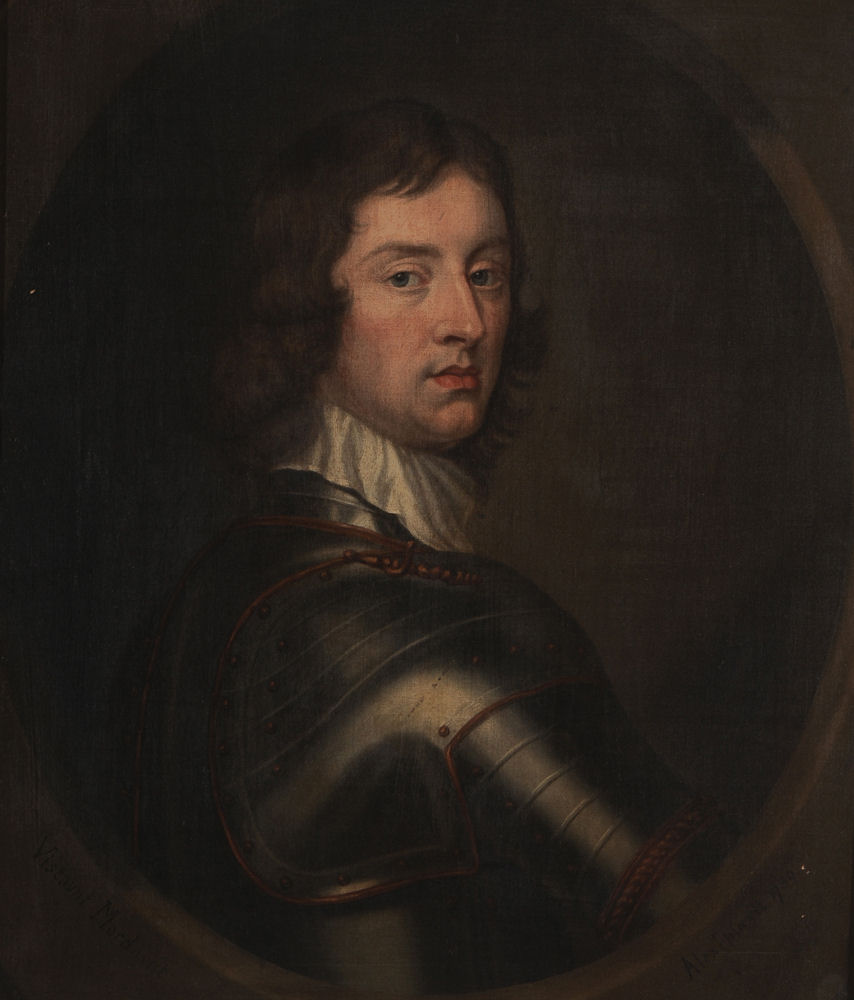
- Lead conspirator John Mordaunt, 1st Viscount Mordaunt
Date	1 August 1659 – 24 August 1659
Location	Cheshire, Lancashire, Denbighshire
Result	Government victory

Belligerents
Commonwealth of England	Royalists

Commanders and leaders
John Lambert; Jerome Sankey	John Mordaunt, 1st Viscount Mordaunt; Sir George Booth; Roger Whitley; Sir Thomas Myddelton; Gilbert Ireland

Strength
3,000 foot; 1,200 horse	c. 4,000

Casualties and losses
1 killed	30 killed 200 captured

Booth's Uprising (Note: Also known as Booth's Rebellion, or the Cheshire Rising of 1659), August 1659, was an attempt to restore Charles II of England. Named after George Booth, it took place during the political turmoil that followed the resignation of Richard Cromwell as head of The Protectorate.

Originally part of a wider revolt organised by John Mordaunt, 1st Viscount Mordaunt, only the portion centred on North West England was successful, with other risings either failing to take place, or being quickly suppressed. Booth seized the important city of Chester, while local commanders at Liverpool and Wrexham also joined, but found himself isolated.

On 19 August, government troops under John Lambert defeated Booth at Winnington Bridge near Northwich. Liverpool and Chester surrendered soon after, but although Booth was captured and briefly imprisoned, he escaped punishment. The Commonwealth collapsed in 1660, leading to the Stuart Restoration in May, and Booth was rewarded with a peerage.

== Background ==
Despite defeat in the First English Civil War, Charles I retained significant political power; this allowed him to create an alliance with Scots Covenanters and Parliamentarian moderates to restore him to the English throne. The moderates, who generally supported a constitutional monarchy, included many Presbyterians, who wanted to retain a state church; they were opposed in Parliament by a minority of religious Independents, who opposed any form of state church, and political radicals like the Levellers.

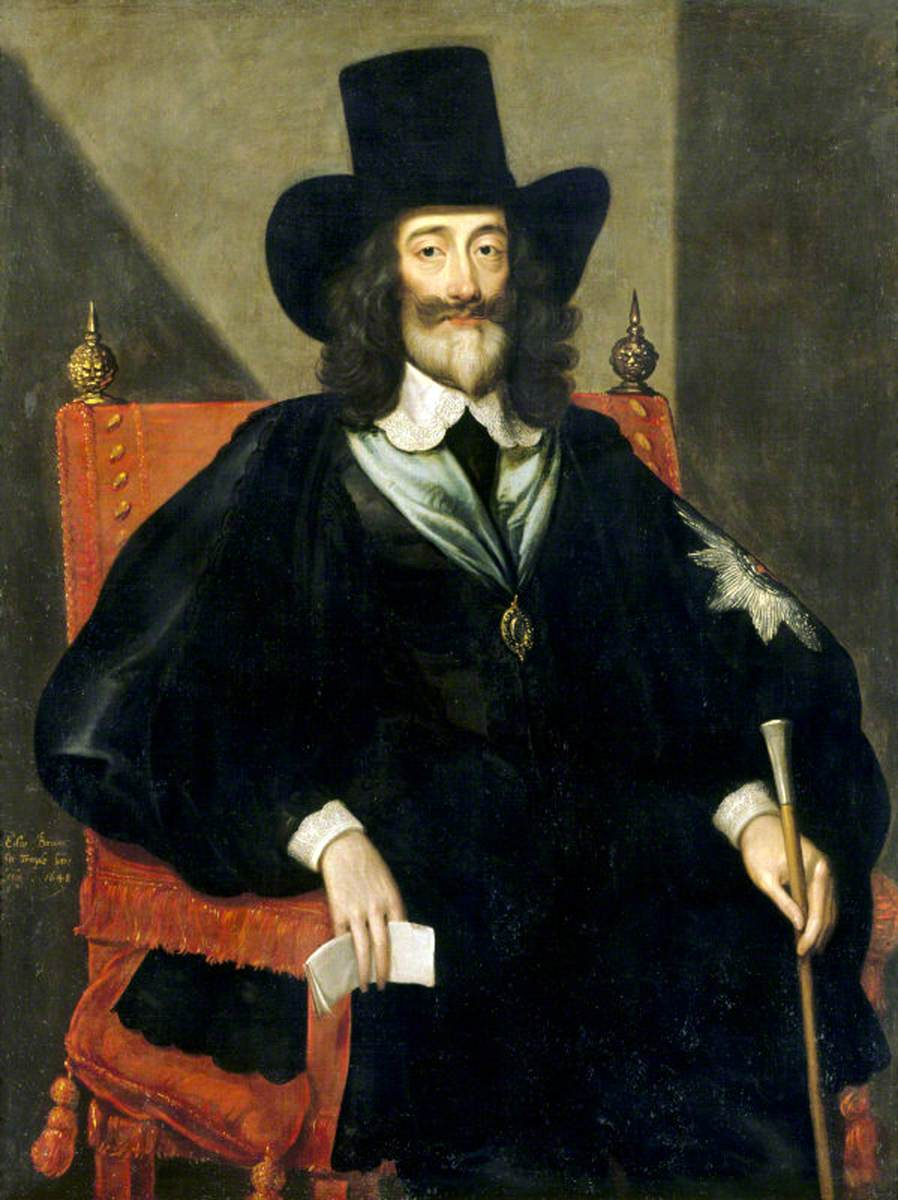
Charles I at his trial, January 1649; many MPs strongly opposed his prosecution for treason.

Although defeated in the 1648 Second English Civil War, Charles continued attempts to instigate another armed uprising. Elements of the New Model Army, including Oliver Cromwell and his supporters in Parliament, argued only his death could bring peace. Their proposal he be prosecuted for treason was opposed by the majority of MPs, many of whom were excluded by Pride's Purge in December 1648; even then, only 83 of the 210 members of the Rump Parliament voted in favour. After Charles was executed in January 1649, Royalist hopes centred on his son, the exiled Charles II of England.

While the 1651 Third English Civil War failed to restore the monarchy, many Parliamentarians opposed the role of the military in government, and continuing instability led to Cromwell's appointment as Lord Protector in 1653. After his death in September 1658, he was succeeded by his son Richard; a significant element of the broad-based Third Protectorate Parliament supported the restoration of monarchy, and deep political divisions meant it was unable to provide stable government. In May 1659, the Army removed Richard Cromwell and re-seated the Rump Parliament; political uncertainty created a situation Royalist agents and the Stuart exiles hoped to exploit.

Underlying these concerns was a growing fear that a "social and religious revolution was imminent". There was a widespread perception the Army and Rump Parliament were actively supporting religious radicals and undermining the gentry's traditional leading role in society. This was heightened when in mid 1659 the country's militia committees were put into the hands of those regarded as "persons of no degree or quality".

=== The Great Trust and Commission ===
A series of poorly planned Royalist revolts after 1648 led to the creation of the Sealed Knot, a small group of aristocrats responsible for co-ordinating future activity in England. It reported to Edward Hyde and the Earl of Ormond, who opposed alliances with other opponents of the Commonwealth, including politically moderate Presbyterians. Its effectiveness was undermined as one member, Sir Richard Willis, was a double agent working for Cromwell's spymaster, John Thurloe, while he also had a long-standing personal dispute with Lord John Belasyse, another of its leaders. By 1659, Hyde, Ormond and the Sealed Knot felt the Commonwealth was collapsing on its own but a faction known as the "Action Party" argued this only be achieved immediately by an uprising.

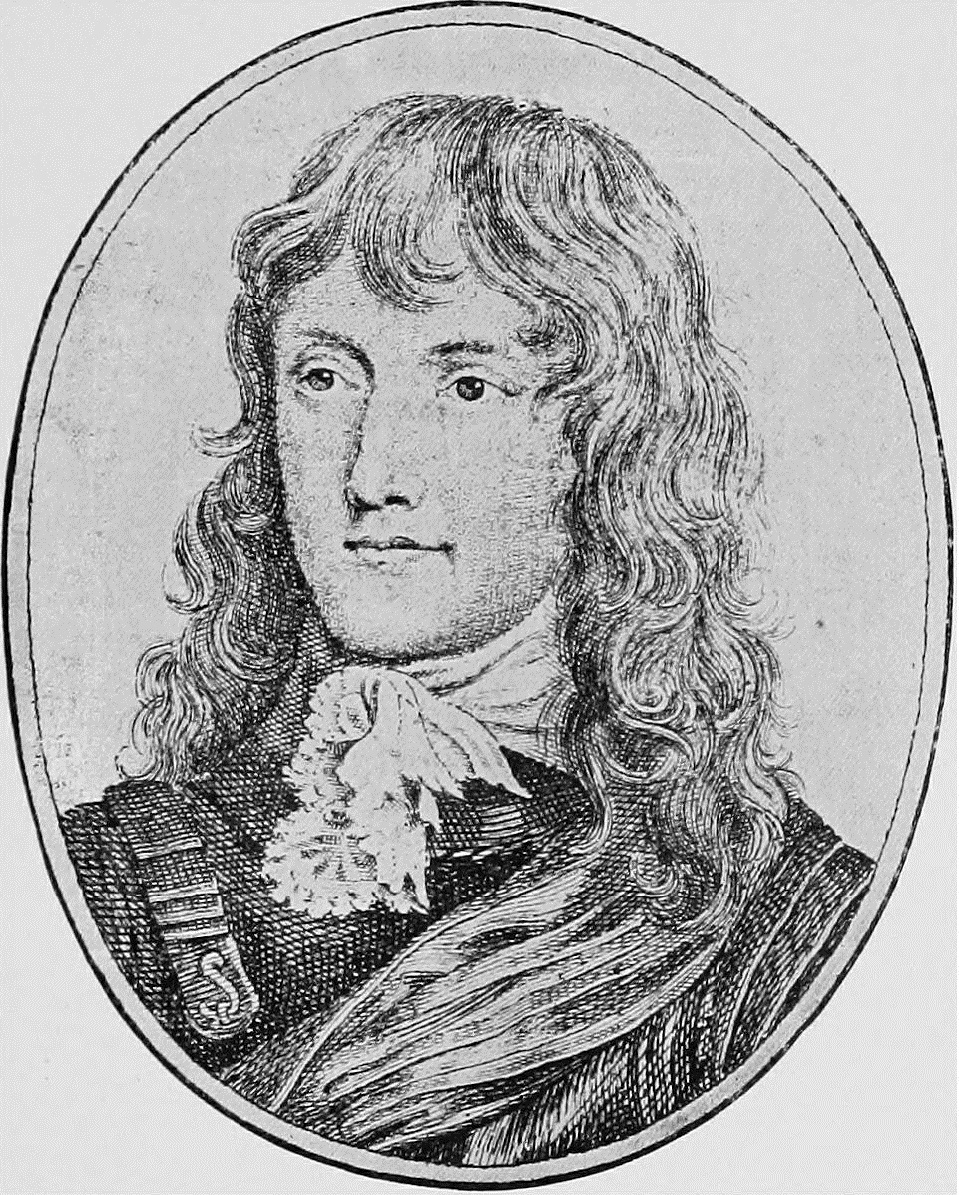
Lord John Belasyse, one of the leaders of the Sealed Knot

With Charles growing increasingly impatient, Hyde secured his own position at court and control of the conspiracy by supporting it. Based on his advice, on 1 March 1659 Charles created the "Great Trust and Commission", which comprised the six members of the Sealed Knot plus John Mordaunt, younger brother of the Earl of Peterborough. Realising his colleagues had little enthusiasm for a revolt they viewed as both unwise and unnecessary, Mordaunt began recruiting others. They included former Royalist officers like William Legge, James Compton, brother of Sealed Knot member William, and moderate Presbyterians including Sir William Waller and Edward Massey.

The strategy was designed by Roger Whitley who argued since there was no guarantee when or where external help would arrive, a decentralised series of local risings would be most flexible. It envisaged uniting impoverished ex-Royalists with disaffected Presbyterians, suggesting Charles encourage the latter by promising "to settle all differences in Religion". Mordaunt was unable to secure commitment from Major-General Browne in London, but focused efforts on strategic ports at Bristol and Lynn, with other major risings at Shrewsbury, Warwick and Worcester, while a series of diversionary actions were planned elsewhere, including one in Cheshire.

By July 1659 Mordaunt felt there was a good chance of success with "confusion now so great [...] dayly and hourely considerable people turn to the King"; in addition to those already mentioned, his agents also claimed support from influential moderate Presbyterians such as Alexander Popham in Wiltshire. While the degree of support was likely exaggerated by Mordaunt, the exiled court also became involved; in July the Duke of York wrote to the North Wales Royalist Sir John Owen stating that "the time draws near for action". Fearing further delays would result in the plans being discovered by the government, Mordaunt issued an order for a general rising on 1 August.

=== The conspiracy in Cheshire and Lancashire ===
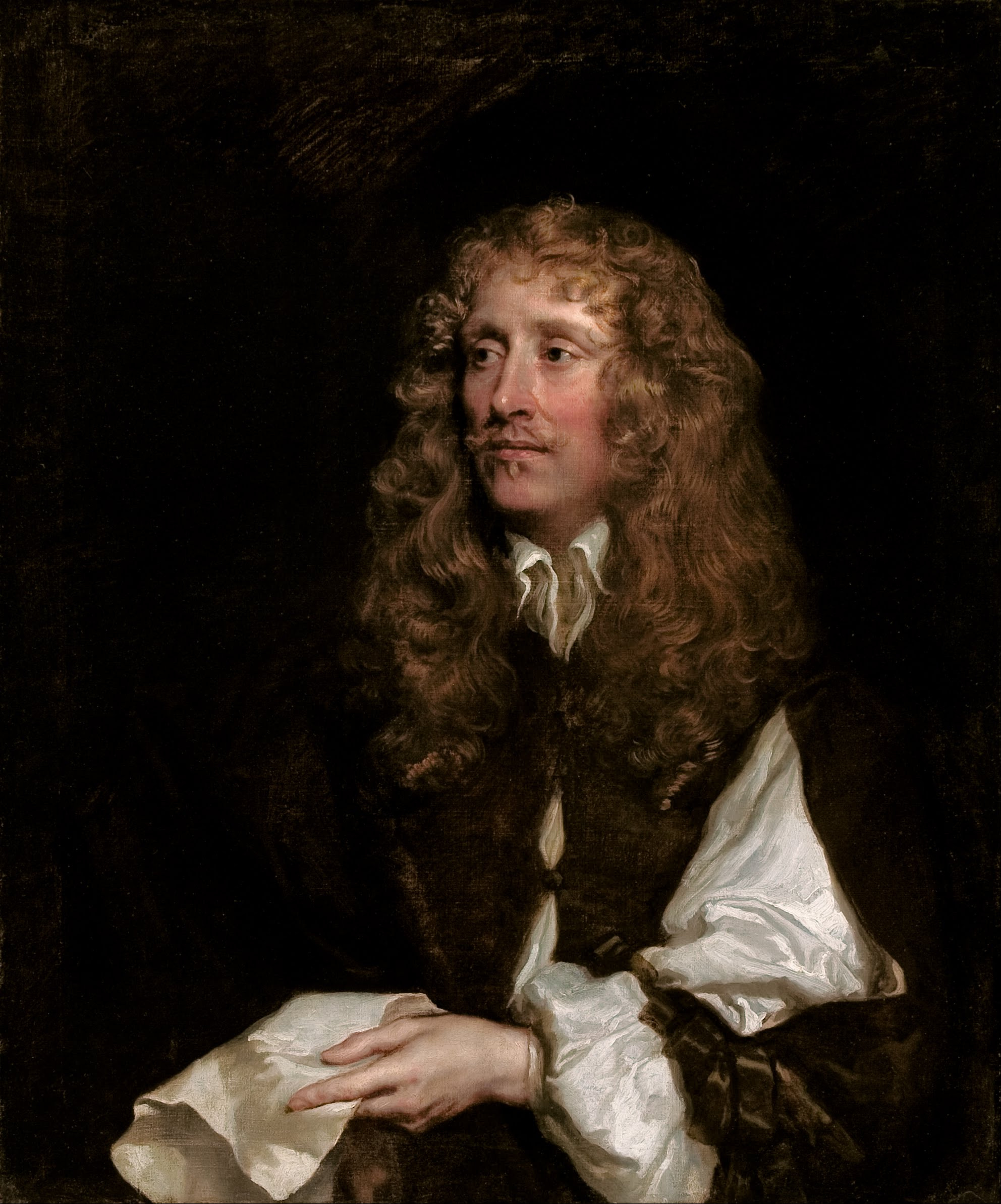
Portrait by Lely thought to be of Sir George Booth.

Mordaunt initially discounted a Cheshire rising due to the lack of credible Royalist leaders in the area. An alternative was provided by Sir George Booth, who fought for Parliament throughout the First Civil War, and was elected MP for Cheshire in 1646. Part of the Presbyterian faction that dominated the Long Parliament and many of the pre-war county elites, Booth was excluded in December 1648, then re-elected in 1652 and retained his seat throughout the Protectorate.

However, he was barred from Parliament on suspicion of involvement in the 1655 Penruddock uprising, while he referred to the Major-Generals as "Cromwell's hangmen". This record of opposition to the regime, social position and wealth combined to make him an attractive figure to the "Great Trust". After meeting Mordaunt several times in London, he joined the conspiracy and returned to Cheshire in May; by July, he had secured a number of promises of local backing.

Although not generally considered a disaffected area, circumstances combined to make Cheshire a suitable recruiting ground. During the First Civil War, Booth's main local rival for leadership of the Parliamentarian cause was Sir William Brereton; in 1646, he was 'one of the most powerful and influential men in England', but he retired to London, leaving a power vacuum. Other factors were the continuing erosion of the gentry's status under the Commonwealth, and the deeply unpopular Charles Worsley, one of the Major-Generals who governed the area from 1655 until his death in 1656.

These issues were mirrored in the adjacent county of Lancashire. Local Presbyterians continued to pray for Charles II after doing so was banned in 1650, but remained loyal in 1651, largely because of the strength of local Catholicism and its association with Royalism. However, in July 1659 Parliament passed a new Militia Act further reducing the power of the old elite, while it was falsely claimed local 'religious schismatics', or Quakers, were preparing a revolt. Many viewed the combination as confirmation of social revolution, including Henry Newcome, Presbyterian minister of Manchester Collegiate church, who was a prominent supporter of the rising.

== The national insurgency ==
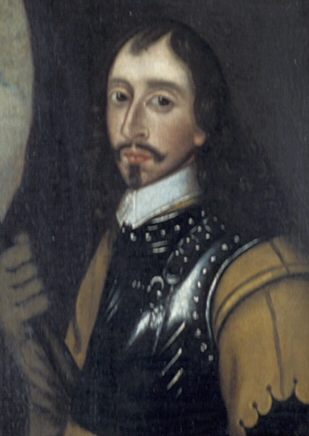
Edward Massey, former Parliamentarian governor of Gloucester; Mordaunt's instructions to him were intercepted on 28 July

Despite the ongoing political instability, the government intelligence service continued to function and was aware of a planned revolt. As early as 9 July, orders were issued to local militias, while the Navy blockaded Ostend, the port through which Charles was most likely to sail for England. On 28 July, the authorities received confirmation of the plan when they intercepted letters from Mordaunt to Edward Massey with final instructions for the rising at Gloucester.

While not necessarily a setback nationally, realisation the government had been alerted probably discouraged many from joining on 1 August, as did a "dismal letter of foreboding" from the Sealed Knot received by local conspirators on 31 July. Local risings began as ordered on 1 August, but it soon became clear numbers were far below those expected. Several rendezvous points were already patrolled by the county militia; 120 horsemen assembled in Sherwood Forest under Richard Byron and Charles White of Newthorpe, intending to take Newark, but were pursued and dispersed.

In Shropshire, Charles Lyttelton was to mount a surprise attack on Shrewsbury, but only 50 men joined him: they marched as far as the Wrekin before dispersing. Mordaunt, who escaped arrest on 28 July, gathered around 30 men on Banstead Downs in Surrey, but fled when it became clear the insurgency was failing. Charles White and others from the Nottinghamshire group reached Derby, where they declared for Charles and briefly tried to raise additional forces, but here as elsewhere the rebels were quickly suppressed.

== Booth's Uprising ==
In Cheshire, Booth seems to have considered cancelling the rising, but as 31 July was a Sunday, many Presbyterian clergy had called on their congregations to join him. This meant men were already being assembled and arms gathered, giving the leaders little choice but to continue; Booth mustered several hundred supporters at Warrington on 1 August. The senior government officer in Lancashire was Colonel Thomas Birch, Booth's colleague during the First English Civil War. He was advised of the letters intercepted on 28 July, but made little effort to stop the rising; Birch was instrumental in the appointment of Newcome to the Manchester Collegiate Church in 1656, and his sympathies may have been divided.

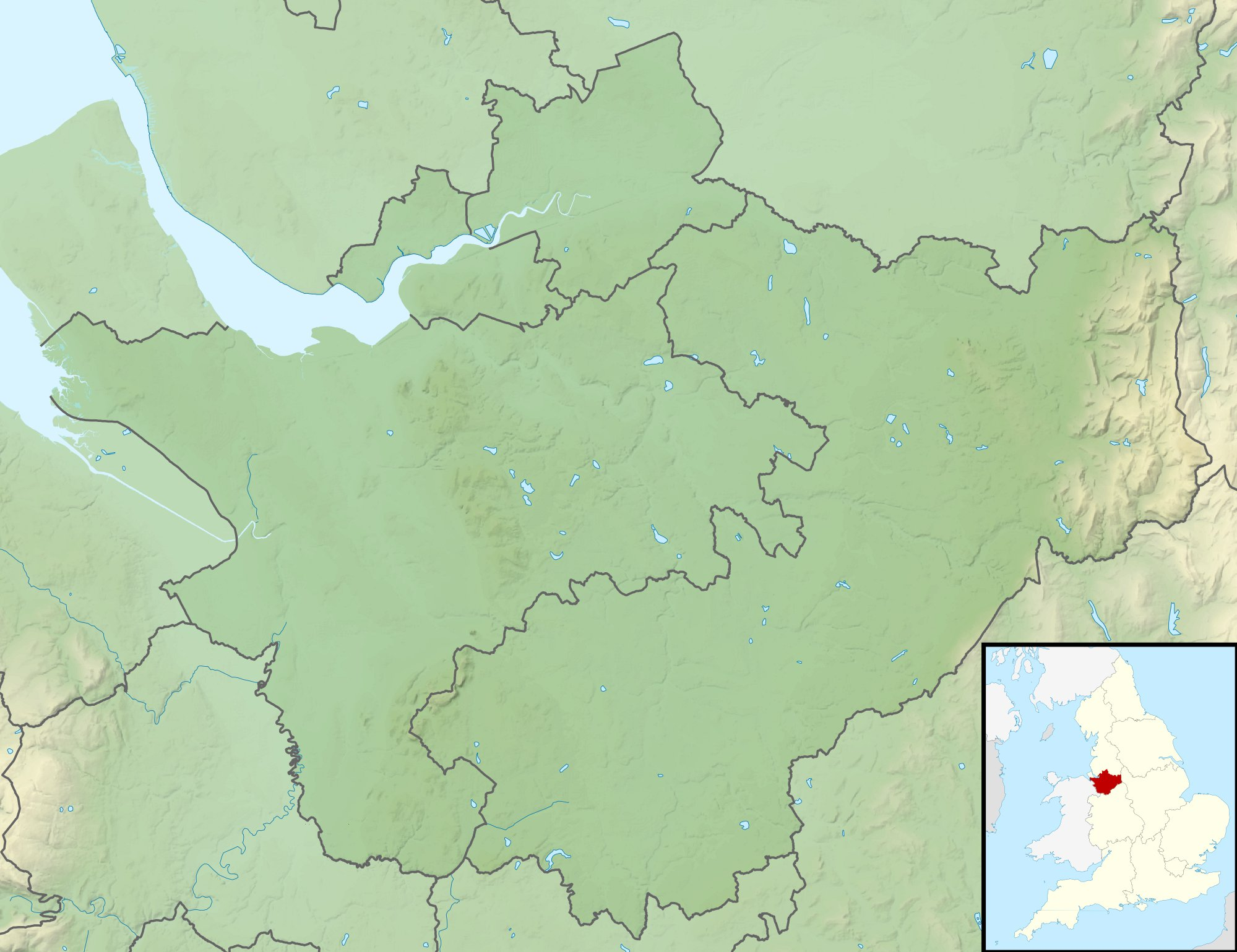
Booth's Uprising, August 1659; key locations

Booth advanced towards Chester and on the 2nd held a new rendezvous at Rowton Heath, where he issued a "Declaration" and a second manifesto titled "A Letter to a Friend". This omitted any mention of Charles, stating only that the rebels wanted the readmission of excluded members of the Long Parliament, or elections to a new Parliament.

Since he was assured of Royalist support, Booth focused on appealing to fellow Presbyterians, combined with attacks on the Rump's corruption, and a promise to the "undeceived part of the Army" to increase their pay. This approach was relatively successful; unlike other parts of the country, he gained the support of "almost all the local gentry and nobility", including former Royalists.

On 3 August sympathisers in Chester allowed Booth into the city; as more recruits came in, his force grew to around 3,000. The governor, Captain Thomas Croxton, and his militia took refuge in Chester Castle; without siege artillery Booth was unable to dislodge them, and after leaving 700 men to blockade the castle, he marched on Manchester with the majority of the rebels. He was joined at Bidston by the Earl of Derby, head of a prominent Royalist family, as well as Gilbert Ireland, MP for Liverpool and another political moderate.

A second contingent under Randolph Egerton left Chester and crossed the Welsh border to Chirk Castle, home of former Parliamentarian commander Sir Thomas Myddelton. Myddelton joined Egerton and led the rebels from Chirk to Wrexham, the area's principal town, drawing in other local sympathisers. Unlike Booth, many of his followers were Royalists, and in contrast to the cautious "Declaration", Myddelton openly proclaimed Charles as King on 7 August.

=== Government response ===
Parliament responded quickly to news of the rising, appointing Major-General John Lambert to suppress it. Two regiments of foot left London on 5 August; Lambert followed the next day with the cavalry and made rapid progress, despite heavy rain and initial near-mutiny among his men due to lack of pay. A brigade of 1,500 foot and horse under Colonels Axtell and Sankey were recalled from Ireland; they arrived at the North Wales port of Beaumaris, although one transport with 30 cavalry sank en route.

Learning of Lambert's approach, Booth appeared uncertain on how to respond, but first attempted to appeal to his soldiers directly by issuing a new communication, the "Express". Faced with the choice of confronting Lambert's veterans, returning to Chester to await the arrival of Charles and his exiles, or retreating towards North Wales, Booth resorted to "wandering about in mid-Cheshire to the dismay of his fellow leaders". Lambert responded to an attempt to open negotiations by demanding he surrender; when a second approach was made by a group of Presbyterian ministers, it simply confirmed his opponents wanted to avoid fighting.

=== Winnington Bridge ===
The foot regiments from London mustered with the cavalry at Market Drayton on 14 August. Lambert reached Nantwich on 15th, while Booth fell back on Chester; the same day two warships blockaded the mouth of the River Dee, preventing aid reaching the rebels by sea. Lambert advanced rapidly towards Northwich and on 18 August, he almost caught Booth's forces by surprise; they were saved only by a rapid withdrawal ordered by Roger Whitley. Lambert's scouts made contact with Booth's rearguard in the Delamere Forest, before camping for the night at Weaverham.

Early on 19 August, most of Booth's force was drawn up in battle order on high, broken ground near Hartford north and west of the River Weaver. Although the ground was unsuitable for cavalry, Lambert nevertheless attacked, driving their outposts back to Winnington Bridge, where they attempted a stand, before retreating after a "fierce but brief" battle. The rebel cavalry was quickly routed, while their infantry escaped into some nearby enclosures. The government army made no effort to pursue them and losses were minimal on both sides; Lambert reported 30 rebels killed at Winnington Bridge, the only notable casualty being Captain Edward Morgan of Golden Grove, Flintshire, killed covering their retreat.

=== End of the uprising ===
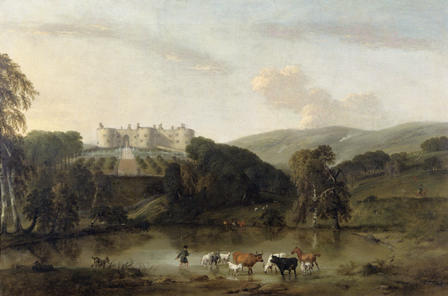
Chirk Castle, in 1725; the final rebel outpost to surrender, at the end of August.

Most of the gentry leaders fled, and then surrendered, following the battle. Chester surrendered to Lambert on 21 August, followed by Liverpool shortly afterwards; the rest of Cheshire and Lancashire were back in government hands within a week. The last to submit were the remaining North Wales insurgents under Myddelton's eldest son Thomas, who withdrew into Chirk Castle; they eventually surrendered to Sankey's "Irish Brigade" at the end of the month.

Booth fled south after Winnington Bridge, travelling in a carriage and disguising himself in women's clothes as "Lady Dorothy". He was eventually arrested at Newport Pagnell after a suspicious innkeeper noted his 'female' guest asking for a barber and a razor: by the end of August he was in custody in London. Mordaunt himself evaded efforts to locate him and escaped the country in September. Despite news of the failures outside Cheshire, Charles travelled to St. Malo in order to join Booth, but learned of his defeat shortly before sailing.

== Aftermath ==
While nearly all the leadership in the Cheshire rising were captured, apart from Whitley, the political background meant they went largely unpunished. Belasyse was arrested on 16 August; accused by Booth of being the main ringleader, he was held in the Tower of London. Most low-status prisoners were quickly released and none of those of higher social rank, including Booth, were brought to trial or lost their estates.

While Mordaunt was undeterred by failure, his plans were rendered irrelevant by the actions of General George Monck in late 1659–60, which led to the readmission of MPs like Booth excluded in 1648. Charles II appointed Belasyse his representative during the negotiations with Monck that led to The Restoration in May 1660, while Booth was sent to Breda by Parliament to escort him to London.

Although Booth was created 1st Baron Delamer, the failure of their uprising only a few months prior to the Restoration meant that he and many other Cheshire insurgents saw relatively little reward for their efforts. This disappointment, along with local distaste for Charles's religious policies after 1661, meant that the lasting legacy of Booth's Uprising was perhaps the creation of the nucleus of an anti-court "Country" party based in the region. Booth's son Henry became a committed Whig who supported the 1688 Glorious Revolution against James II.

== Sources ==
- Second Report of the Royal Commission on Historical Manuscripts. HMSO. 1871.
- Atkinson, James, ed. (1909). Tracts relating to the civil war in Cheshire, 1641–1659; including Sir George Booth's rising in that county. Chetham Society.
- Blackwood, B.G. (1979). The Lancashire Gentry and the Great Rebellion, 1640–60. Manchester University Press.
- Broxap, Ernest (1910). The Great Civil War in Lancashire. Manchester University Press.
- Hopper, Andrew (2020). "The War Hero, the Eccentric and the Turncoat: the Men Behind Three Signatures". Civil War Petitions: Conflict, Welfare and Memory during and after the English Civil Wars, 1642 – 1710.
- Jenkins, Geraint (1987). The Foundations of Modern Wales: Wales 1642–1780.
- Jones, J. R. (1957). "Booth's Rising of 1659". Bulletin of the John Rylands Library. 39 (2): 416–443. doi:10.7227/BJRL.39.2.6.
- Kelsey, David (2004). "Booth, George, first Baron Delamer [Delamere]". Oxford Dictionary of National Biography (online ed.). Oxford University Press. doi:10.1093/ref:odnb/2877. (Subscription, Wikipedia Library access or UK public library membership required.)
- Ludlow, Edmund (1771). Memoirs of Edmund Ludlow Esq. Becket & de Hondt.
- Mayers, Ruth (2004). 1659: The Crisis of the Commonwealth.
- Morrill, John (1974). Cheshire 1630–1660: County Government and Society During the English Revolution. Oxford University Press.
- Morrill, John (1985). "Sir William Brereton and England's Wars of Religion". Journal of British Studies. 3 (24): 311–332. doi:10.1086/385837. JSTOR 175522. S2CID 143990745.
- Newman, Peter (1978). The Royalist Army in Northern England, Volume II (PDF) (PHD). University of York.
- Plant, David (2008a). "Booth's Uprising, 1659". BCW Project.
- Plant, David (2008b). "Great Trust and Commission". BCW Project.
- Scott, David (2003). Politics and War in the Three Stuart Kingdoms, 1637–49. Macmillan.
- Smuts, Robert (1999). Culture and Power in England, 1585–1685. Macmillan.
- Tucker, Norman (1958). North Wales in the Civil War. Gee & Son.
- Underdown, David (1971). Royalist Conspiracy in England, 1649–1660. Archon.
- Whitehead, David (2004). "Birch, Thomas". Oxford Dictionary of National Biography (online ed.). Oxford University Press. doi:10.1093/ref:odnb/66520. (Subscription, Wikipedia Library access or UK public library membership required.)
