= Battle of Winnington Bridge =

1644 failed Royalist revolt in England

Coordinates: 53.269224°N 2.538381°W

- Part of Booth's Uprising
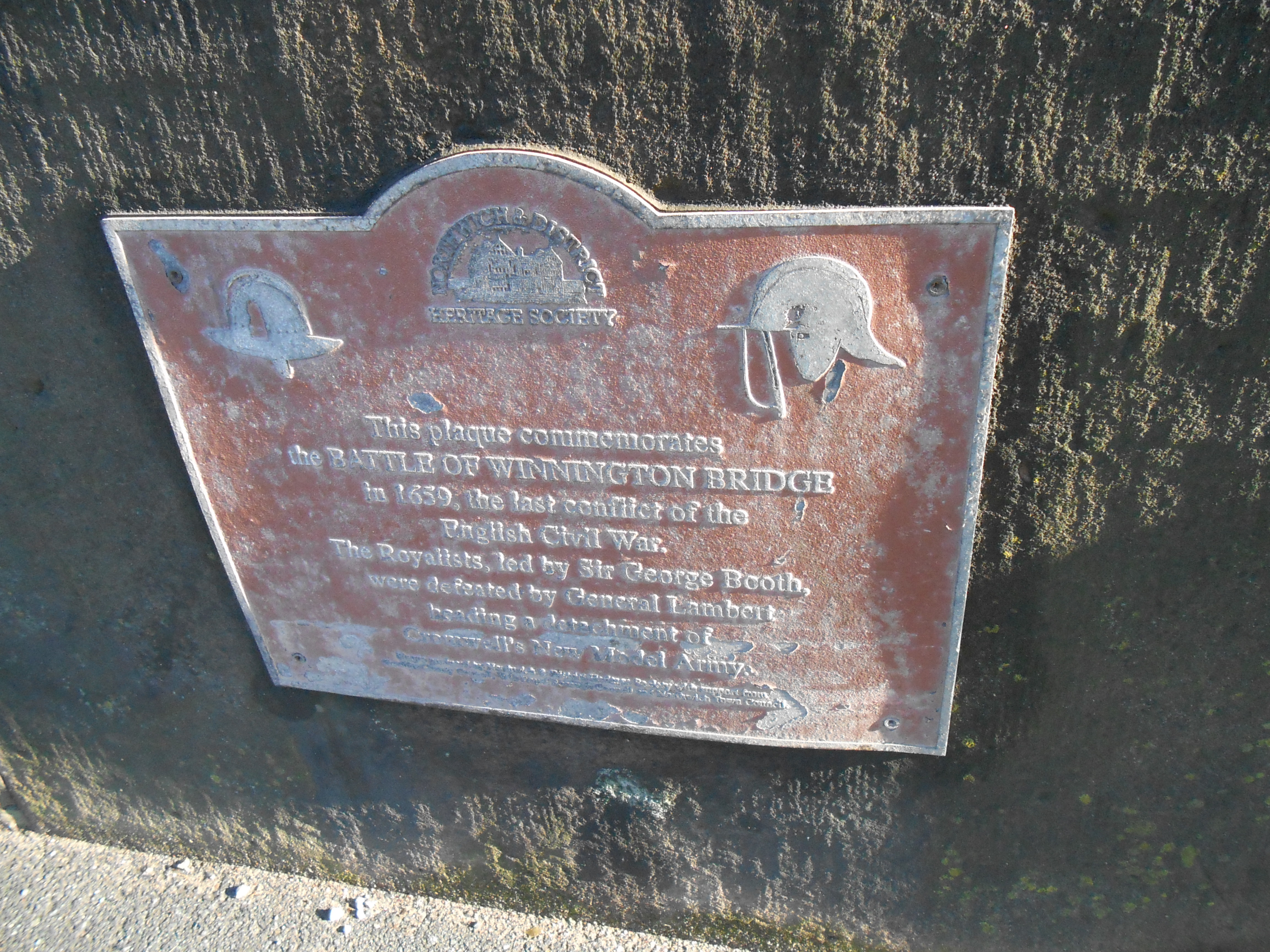
- A plaque on the modern bridge commemorating the battle
Date	19 August 1659
Location	Winnington Bridge, Barnton, Northwich (A533 over the River Weaver)
Result	Government victory

Belligerents
Commonwealth of England	Royalists

Commanders and leaders
General John Lambert	Sir George Booth; Sir Edward Broughton

Strength
5,000	4,000

Casualties and losses
1 killed	30 killed 200 captured
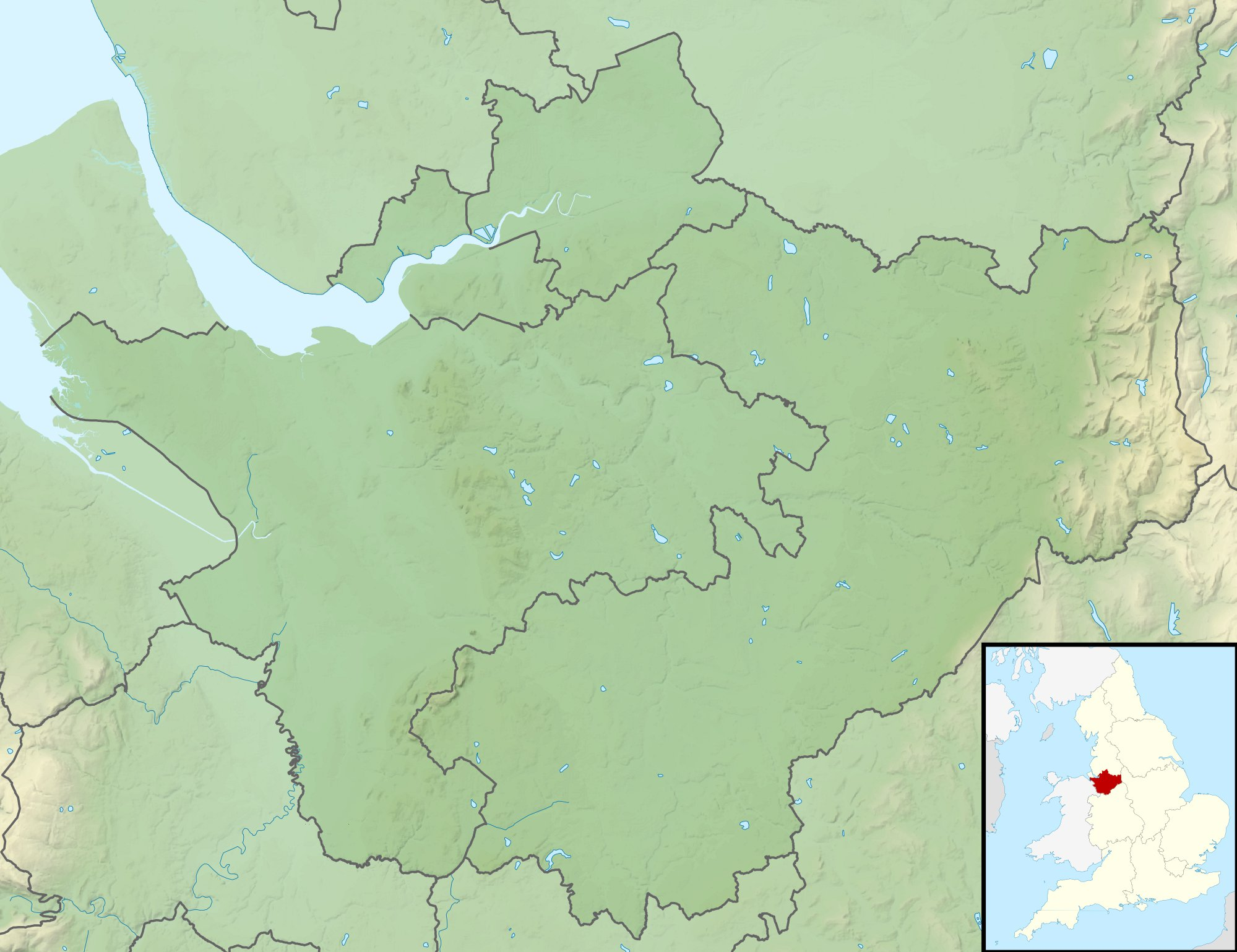
- Location within Cheshire

The Battle of Winnington Bridge, often described as the last battle of the English Civil War, took place on 19 August 1659 during Booth's Uprising, a Royalist rebellion in north-west England and Wales.

During the battle a Parliamentary army of around 5,000 men under the command of General John Lambert defeated a rebel army of 4,000 men under the command of Sir George Booth.

== Background ==
The rebels had first mustered under Booth at Warrington on 1 August. Booth's rising was part of a larger national conspiracy, led by John Mordaunt, 1st Viscount Mordaunt, to return the exiled Charles II by taking advantage of ongoing political instability in the Commonwealth of England. While the national rising was quickly suppressed, Booth had local success, seizing the city of Chester and attracting 3-4,000 followers. Liverpool and parts of north-east Wales also declared for the rebels.

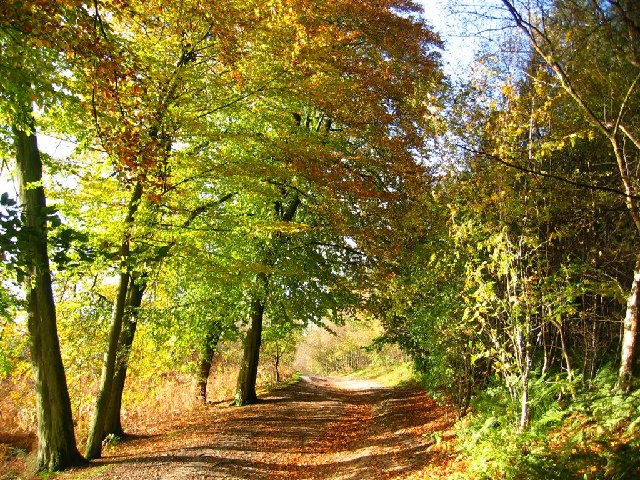
Delamere Forest; Lambert attempted to intercept Booth's rebels here the day before confronting them at Winnington Bridge

Booth initially began marching towards Manchester, but quickly realised that he was isolated, and turned back after receiving reports that government forces under General John Lambert were en route to confront him. While Booth had been a Parliamentarian colonel in the First English Civil War, he was unsure how to respond; he opened negotiations with Lambert, while simultaneously attempting to withdraw to the relative safety of Chester.

Lambert had left London on 6 August, following two infantry regiments that had set out the previous day. By 10th he had reached Coventry; on 14th the infantry rendezvoused with cavalry forces at Market Drayton in Shropshire. By 15th Lambert and the main army were at Nantwich; a force under Robert Lilburne was marching on Cheshire from the north, while Parliament had ordered a 1,500-strong brigade under Sankey to sail from Dublin to Beaumaris and secure the rebel districts' western flank.

Lambert was making directly for Chester, but on receiving information that Booth and a force estimated at 4-5,000 were near Northwich, advanced to cut off the rebels in the area of Delamere Forest. Lambert's rapid advance took the rebels by surprise and only a retreat ordered by Roger Whitley saved them from being overrun. On the evening of 18 August Lambert's scouts made contact with Booth's rearguard in Delamere Forest, but as darkness fell the two armies went into quarters, Lambert in Weaverham and Booth a few miles to the east in Northwich.

== Battle ==
On the early morning of 19th Lambert found that the rebels had drawn up north of the River Weaver. Booth held the river crossing at Winnington Bridge, placing additional skirmishers on its approaches; the majority of his army was positioned on high ground north of the river, protected by steep slopes and a ditch at the base of the hill.

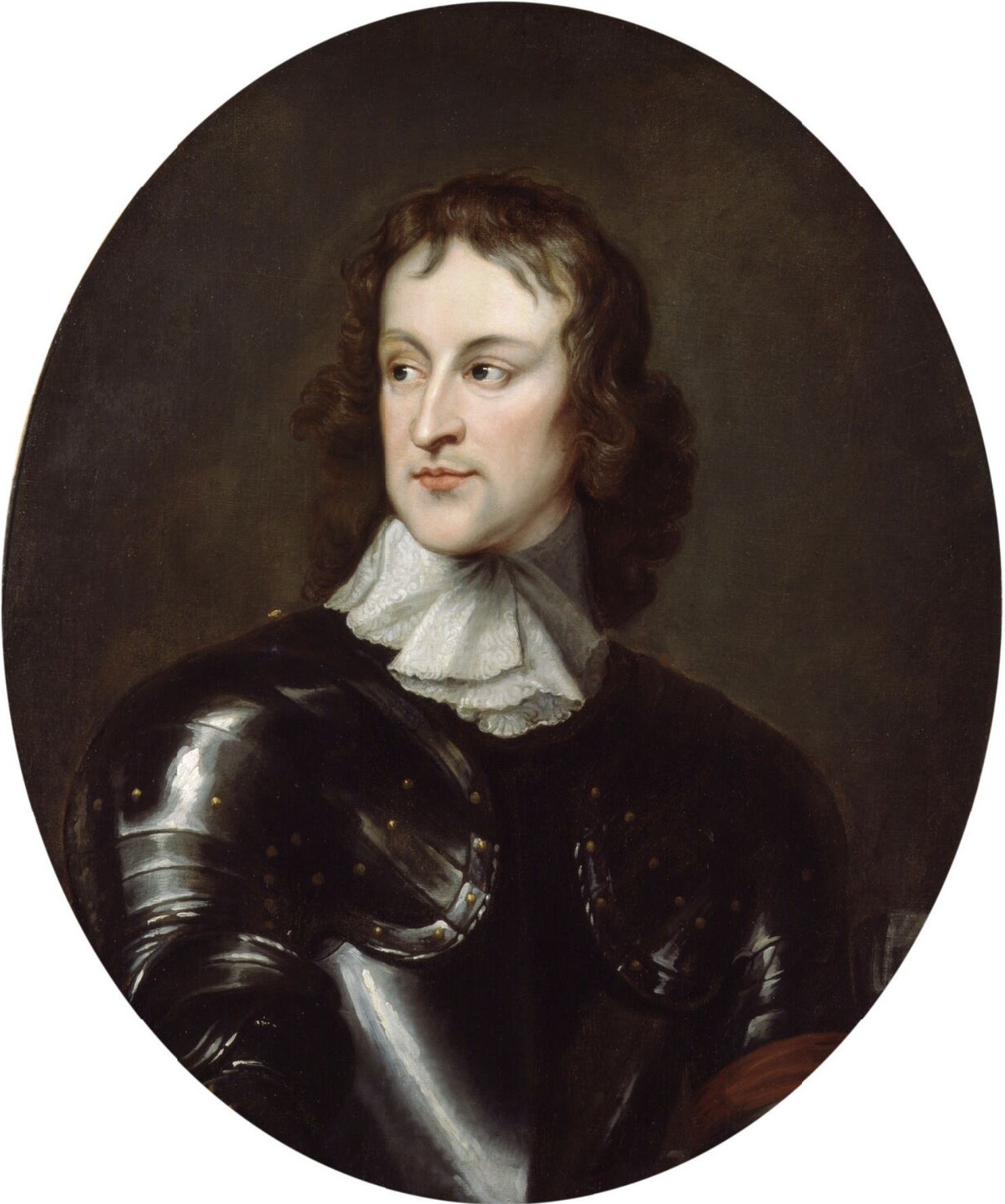
General John Lambert, appointed to suppress the Cheshire rebellion

Lambert attacked aggressively, driving in Booth's outposts from Hartford as far as Winnington Bridge itself. An attack on the bridge by Hewson's regiment of foot met with little resistance; Mordaunt (who was not present) later claimed that of Booth's infantry "some had no match, others no ball", while it was also reported Booth had left most of his stores of powder in Chester by an "absurd mistake". Much of the rebel infantry, commanded by Sir Edward Broughton of Marchwiel, fled into some nearby enclosures, where Lambert's foot were too tired to pursue them and where the hedges kept them safe from cavalry.

With the bridge cleared, Lambert moved his cavalry up to deal with the remainder of Booth's force. While the steep, narrow lanes leading uphill from the bridge made cavalry operation difficult, Lambert was able to engage the rebel cavalry, who broke and scattered after a brief skirmish. Some accounts (including that of Mordaunt, who suggested the rebel cavalry "trotted away, which is the civilest term") suggest the majority of Booth's troops simply fled, though Lambert himself claimed that "they fought gallantly at the first" and that both sides fought "like Englishmen". The detachment of rebels remaining in Northwich were attacked by government dragoons and fled towards Manchester.

Lambert did not order a pursuit of the rebel foot, supposedly commenting "alas, these are forced and hired". He reported only a single fatality, while 30 rebels were casualties; the most prominent were Captain Edward Morgan of Golden Grove, Flintshire, who was killed covering the rebel retreat, and Thomas Legh, younger brother of Piers Legh of Bruche. About 200 prisoners were taken and held overnight in Northwich church.

== Aftermath ==
Most of the gentry leaders fled, and then surrendered, following the battle.

Chester opened its gates to Lambert on 21 August; Liverpool surrendered shortly afterwards, and the remaining parts of Cheshire and Lancashire were back in government hands within a week.
