= Sir Richard Hoghton, 3rd Baronet =

English politician

Sir Richard Hoghton, 3rd Baronet (c. 1616 – 3 February 1678) was an English politician who sat in the House of Commons at various times between 1640 and 1656. He supported the Parliamentary cause in the English Civil War.

== Biography ==
Hoghton was the eldest son of Sir Gilbert Hoghton, 2nd Baronet.

In 1645, Hoghton was elected Member of Parliament for Lancashire in the Long Parliament. Unlike his Royalist father, he was a zealous supporter of parliament and a firm adherent of the Presbyterian cause. He succeeded his father in the baronetcy in April 1647. In 1656 he was re-elected MP for Lancashire in the Second Protectorate Parliament.

He was appointed Sheriff of Lancashire in 1659. After the restoration Hoghton was a patron of nonconformist ejected ministers.

== Family ==
Hoghton married Lady Sarah, daughter of Philip Stanhope, 1st Earl of Chesterfield, and had several sons and daughters: of the sons, those survived to maturity were:

- Charles, his successor, and the great-great-great-grandfather of author/mathematician Lewis Carroll.
- Benjamin, who died unmarried.

== Character ==
One who knew him well gives this character of him:—"It has pleased Almighty God, by a sudden stroke, to make a sad breach in a worthy family, in taking away the chief head thereof; a person of great worth and honour, of an honourable extraction, of a generous disposition, and of a courteous, kind, and affable temper...".

== Notes ==
Parliament of England
Preceded by Ralph Asheton; Roger Kirkby	Member of Parliament for Lancashire; 1645–1653; With: Ralph Asheton	Succeeded by William West; John Sawry; Robert Cunliffe
Preceded by Richard Holland; Gilbert Ireland; Richard Standish; William Ashurst	Member of Parliament for Lancashire; 1656; With: Richard Holland; Gilbert Ireland; Richard Standish	Succeeded by Sir George Booth, Bt; Alexander Rigby
Baronetage of England
Preceded by Gilbert Hoghton	Baronet (of Hoghton Tower); 1647–1678	Succeeded by Charles Hoghton
