= Richard Shuttleworth (MP for Preston) =

English politician

Richard Shuttleworth (1587–1669) was an English politician who sat in the House of Commons variously between 1640 and 1659.

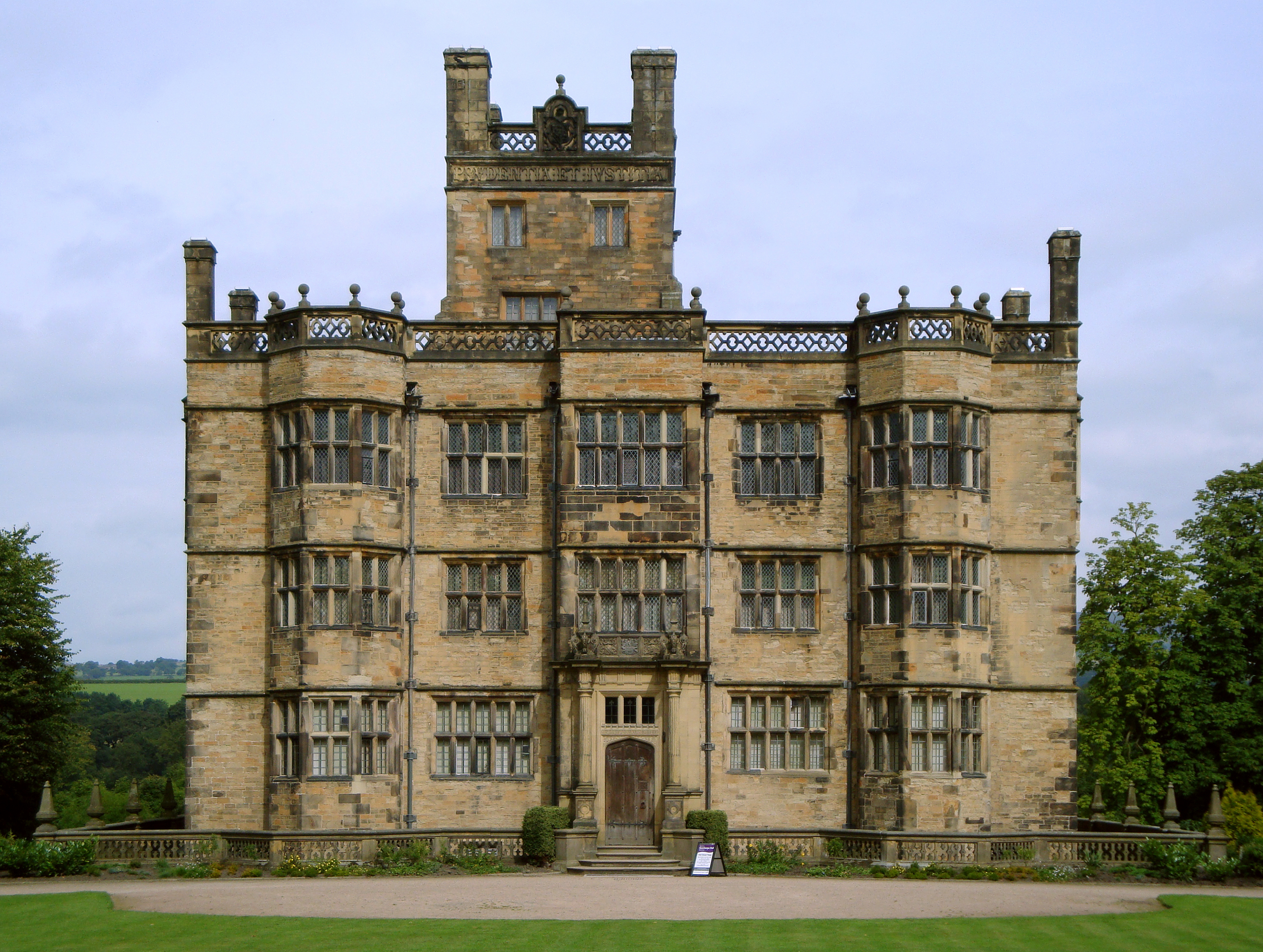
Gawthorpe Hall, Lancashire

Shuttleworth was the son of Thomas Shuttleworth and his wife Anne Lever, daughter of Richard Lever. In 1607 he inherited the family estates of Gawthorpe from his uncle, the Rev Lawrence Shuttleworth.

He served as High Sheriff of Lancashire for 1618 and 1637 and in April 1640 was elected as Member of Parliament for Preston in the Short Parliament. He was re-elected in November 1640 for the Long Parliament and sat until 1648 when he was possibly secluded or chose not to sit after Pride's Purge. In 1654 Shuttleworth was re-elected for Preston in the First Protectorate Parliament. He was re-elected for Preston for the Second Protectorate Parliament in 1656 and for the Third Protectorate Parliament in 1659.

During the interregnum, Shuttleworth was a leading magistrate for Blackburn hundred with John Starkie of Huntroyde and was frequently recorded as officiating at marriages. He supported the Parliamentarian side in the English Civil War, serving as a colonel in the parliamentary army.

Shuttleworth died at the age of 82. He had married Fleetwood Barton, daughter of Mary and Richard Barton of Barton-in-Amounderness with whom he had eight sons and four daughters, Richard, Nicholas, Ughtred, Barton, John, Edward, William, Thomas, Anne (died in infancy) Margaret, Anne and Ellinor. Four of his sons fought in the Parliamentary army in the Civil War. His son Richard was MP for Clitheroe.

Parliament of England
Vacant Parliament suspended since 1629	Member of Parliament for Preston; 1640–1648; With: Thomas Standish 1640–1642; William Langton 1645–1648	Not represented in the Rump Parliament
Vacant Not represented in the Barebones Parliament	Member of Parliament for Preston; 1654–1659; With: Richard Standish 1659	Vacant Not represented in restored Rump Title next held by Alexander Rigby and Richard Standish
