= William West (1612–1670) =

English politician, died 1670

William West (1 February 1612 – December 1670) was an English politician who sat in the House of Commons variously between 1653 and 1660. He fought on the Parliamentary side in the English Civil War.

West was a colonel in the Parliamentary army by 1653 and served as MP for Lancashire in the Barebones Parliament. In 1659, he acquired the manor of Middleton, Lancashire.

Also in 1659, West was elected member of parliament for Lancaster in the Third Protectorate Parliament. He was re-elected MP for Lancaster for the Convention Parliament in 1660.

West died at the age of 58 and was buried on 7 December 1670.

West's first wife Juliana died in 1666. He subsequently married Frances Kirkby, daughter of Roger Kirkby of Kirkby Ireleth.

Parliament of England
Preceded by Ralph Ashton; Sir Richard Hoghton, 3rd Baronet	Member of Parliament for Lancashire; 1653; With: John Sawry; Robert Cunliss	Succeeded by Richard Holland; Gilbert Ireland; Richard Standish; William Ashurst
Preceded by Henry Porter	Member of Parliament for Lancaster; 1659; With: Henry Porter	Succeeded by Thomas Fell
Preceded by Thomas Fell	Member of Parliament for Lancaster; 1660; With: Sir Gilbert Gerard, 1st Baronet of Harrow on the Hill	Succeeded by Richard Kirkby; John Harrison
