= Edward Rigby (1627–1686) =

English politician

Edward Rigby (1627 – July 1686) was an English politician. He sat as MP for Preston on 7 August 1660, 1661, March 1679 and October 1679.

He was baptised on 15 April 1627. He was the third son of Alexander Rigby and the brother of Alexander Rigby. He entered Gray's Inn in 1641 and was called to the bar in 1649. He became an Ancient in 1662. Circa. 1650, he married his first wife, Alice, the daughter of Sir Thomas Wilsford and they had four sons and two daughters. On 12 October 1665, he married his second wife Anne, the daughter of Sir Francis Molyneux, 2nd Baronet. His marriage to his third wife, Sarah was licensed on 26 June 1671.
