= Thomas Blackmore =

English politician

Thomas Blackmore was an English politician who served on Liverpool corporation and sat in the House of Commons in 1659.

Blackmore was an alderman of the borough of Liverpool. In 1659, he was elected Member of Parliament for Liverpool in the Third Protectorate Parliament. After the Restoration, he was discharged in 1662, with other members of Liverpool Corporation, for refusing to subscribe to the declaration for the good governance of corporations.

Parliament of England
Preceded by Thomas Birch	Member of Parliament for Liverpool; 1659; With: Gilbert Ireland	Succeeded by Not represented in Restored Rump
