= Alexander Rigby (died 1694) =

English politician

Alexander Rigby (22 August 1620 – February, 1694) was an English politician who sat in the House of Commons in 1659 and 1660.

Rigby was the son of Alexander Rigby of Middleton in Goosnargh near Preston and his wife Lucy Legh of Manchester. He succeeded father at Middleton in 1650.

In 1659, Rigby was elected Member of Parliament for Lancashire in the Third Protectorate Parliament. In April 1660 he was elected MP for Preston in the Convention Parliament, but was unseated on petition.

Rigby died at the age of 73 and was buried on 4 March 1694.

Parliament of England
Preceded by Gilbert Ireland; Richard Standish; Richard Holland; Sir Richard Hoghton, 3rd Baronet	Member of Parliament for Lancashire; 1659; With: Sir George Booth Bt	Succeeded by Sir Richard Hoghton, 3rd Baronet
