= Gilbert Ireland =

English politician

Sir Gilbert Ireland (1624 – 30 April 1675) of Hale Hall, Lancashire was an English politician who sat in the House of Commons at various times between 1654 and 1675.

Ireland was the son of John Ireland of Hutt and Hale and his wife Elizabeth Hays, daughter of Sir Thomas Hays, alderman of London. He was a grandson of Sir Gilbert Ireland who brought the giant John Middleton to court. He inherited both the house at Hutt and Hale Hall on the death of his father in 1633. In 1645, he was one of committee appointed by parliament to assess taxes in Lancashire. He was High Sheriff of Lancashire in 1648.

In 1654, Ireland was elected Member of Parliament for Lancashire in the First Protectorate Parliament, and was re-elected in 1656 for the Second Protectorate Parliament. In 1659, he was elected MP for Liverpool in the Third Protectorate Parliament. Ireland was re-elected MP for Liverpool in April 1660 for the Convention Parliament. He was knighted at the Restoration on 16 June 1660. In 1661 he was re-elected MP for Liverpool for the Cavalier Parliament and sat until his death in 1675.

In 1674 he moved into Hale Hall after completing alterations to the house. He hid the gables on the north front of the Jacobean building behind a brick parapet which was ornamented with stone medallions and other features and arched over the recesses between the bays. On the tower he placed a stone tablet inscribed "Built by Sir Gilbert Ireland, Knt, and Dame Margt, Ao dI 1674".

He was elected Mayor of Liverpool in 1674 but died during his year of office. Ireland had married Margaret Ireland, daughter of Thomas Ireland of Beausey, Lancashire, but died without issue. Hale Hall passed to his nephew, also Gilbert.

Parliament of England
Preceded by William West; John Sawry; Robert Cunliffe	Member of Parliament for Lancashire; 1654–1656; With: Richard Holland 1654–1656; Richard Standish 1654–1656; William Ashurst 1654; Sir Richard Hoghton, 3rd Baronet 1656	Succeeded by Sir George Booth Bt; Alexander Rigby
Preceded by Thomas Birch	Member of Parliament for Liverpool; 1659; With: Thomas Blackmore	Succeeded by Not represented in Restored Rump
