= William Langton (MP) =

English lawyer and politician

William Langton (died 1659) was an English lawyer and politician who sat in the House of Commons between 1645 and 1648.

Langton was the son of Roger Langton of Amounderness, Lancashire, He was educated at St John's College, Cambridge and was admitted at Gray's Inn in 1630. He was called to the Bar on 23 June 1637 and became Recorder of Liverpool and Town clerk of Preston.

In 1645, Langton was elected Member of Parliament for Preston in the Long Parliament. Although not excluded under Pride's Purge he is not recorded as sitting after 1648.

Langton lived at Broughton Tower. He died in 1659 and was buried at Preston on 25 October 1659.

Parliament of England
Preceded by Thomas Standish; Richard Shuttleworth	Member of Parliament for Preston; 1645–1648; With: Richard Shuttleworth	Succeeded by Not represented in the Rump parliament
