= Edward Tyrrell (MP for Buckingham) =

Sir Edward Tyrrell (1551 – 29 January 1606) was an English politician who sat in the House of Commons from 1604 to 1606, as the Member of Parliament for Buckingham. He served as High Sheriff of Buckinghamshire from 1595–96.

== Early life ==
Tyrrell was the son of George Tyrrell of Thornton, Buckinghamshire, and his wife Eleanor Montagu, daughter of Sir Edward Montagu. He inherited Thornton on the death of his father in 1571 and later built a house there called "The Toy". He may have matriculated at Trinity College, Cambridge in 1573.

== Career ==
He was appointed High Sheriff of Buckinghamshire for 1595–96. He was knighted at the Charterhouse on 11 May 1603.

In 1604, Tyrrell was elected Member of Parliament for Buckingham. He died in office in 1606.

He died in 1606 and was buried in Thornton church.

== Marriages and family ==
Tyrrell married firstly Mary Lee, daughter of Benedict Lee of Huncote Buckinghamshire and had two daughters and a son Edward who became a baronet.

He married secondly Margaret Egerton widow of Thomas Egerton and daughter of Thomas Aston of Aston, Cheshire. Their children included:

- Timothy Tyrrell (died 1632), who was Master of the Buckhounds to Prince Henry and Charles I
- John Tyrrell
- Thomas Tyrrell
- Penelope Tyrrell
- Frances Tyrrell, a maid of honour to Princess Elizabeth, who married Edward Broughton of Marchwiel
- Theodosia Tyrrell, who married Edward West of Marsworth
- Phillipa Tyrrell, who married John Nourse of Woodeaton
- Bridget Tyrrell, who married the author William Sanderson.

Parliament of England
Preceded by Christopher Hatton; Robert Newdigate	Member of Parliament for Buckingham; 1604; With: Sir Thomas Denton	Succeeded by Sir Thomas Denton; Sir Francis Goodwin
Political offices
Preceded by Michael Harcourt	High Sheriff of Buckinghamshire; 1596	Succeeded by Anthony Tyringham
