= Standish baronets =

Extinct baronetcy in the Baronetage of England

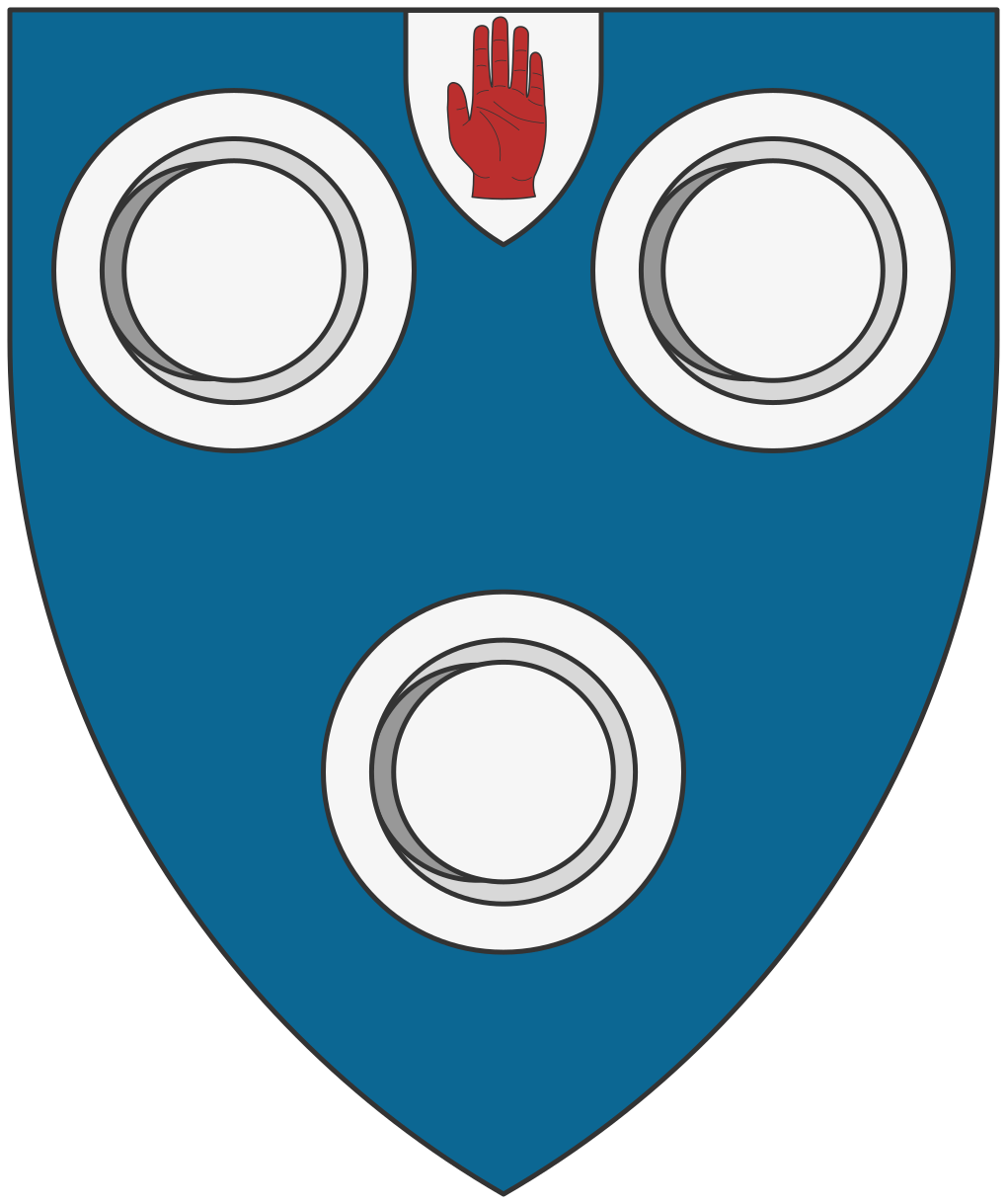
The coat of arms of the Standishes of Duxbury

The Standish Baronetcy, of Duxbury in the County of Lancaster, was a title in the Baronetage of England. It was created on 8 February 1677 for Richard Standish, subsequently member of parliament for Wigan. The title became extinct on the death of the third baronet in 1812.

== Standish baronets, of Duxbury (1677) ==
- Sir Richard Standish, 1st Baronet (1653–1693)
- Sir Thomas Standish, 2nd Baronet (died 1756)
- Sir Frank Standish, 3rd Baronet (c. 1746–1812)

== See also ==
- Frank Hall Standish
- Standish family
