= Richard Standish =

English politician (1621–1662)

Richard Standish (21 October 1621 – March 1662) was an English politician who sat in the House of Commons in 1659 and 1660. He was a colonel in the Parliamentarian army in the English Civil War.

== Biography ==
Standish was on 21 October 1621, to Thomas Standish of Duxbury, the MP for Preston and his wife Anne Wingfield, daughter of Sir Richard Wingfield of Letheringham, Suffolk.

He inherited the Manor of Duxbury and Duxbury Hall after the death of his elder brother Alexander in 1648. In 1654, he was elected member of parliament for Lancashire in the First Protectorate Parliament. He was re-elected MP for Lancashire in 1656 for the Second Protectorate Parliament. In 1659, he was elected MP for Preston in the Third Protectorate Parliament. He was re-elected in March 1660 for Preston in the Convention Parliament, but the election was declared void on 20 June.

Standish died in March 1662, aged 40. He had married Elizabeth, the daughter of Piers Legh of Lyme, Cheshire, with whom he had six sons and three daughters. His son Richard was created a baronet in 1677.

Parliament of England
Preceded by Richard Shuttleworth	Member of Parliament for Preston; 1659–1660; With: Richard Shuttleworth 1659; Alexander Rigby 1660	Succeeded by Edward Rigby; Edward Fleewood
