= Composition of Connacht =

1585 agreement between chiefs of Connacht and Thomond and Kingdom of Ireland

The Composition of Connacht, or Composition of Connaught and Thomond, was a 1585 agreement between, on the one hand, the Gaelic and Gaelicised chiefs of Connacht and Thomond and, on the other hand, the English Dublin Castle administration of the Kingdom of Ireland, which replaced the multiple existing levies with a single tax on land holdings. The Composition was a form of surrender and regrant, a part of the Tudor reconquest of Ireland. The English leaders were Sir John Perrot, as Lord Deputy of Ireland, and Sir Richard Bingham, as Governor of the Presidency of Connacht.

Connacht was made a Presidency in 1569 and divided into counties afterwards, but the county administration did not function efficiently until the Composition. In 1577, Lord Deputy Henry Sidney instigated a first Composition, which collapsed when President Nicholas Malby died. Under the 1585 Composition, the "countries" (cantreds or trícha céts) of the chiefs became baronies of the counties. The counties affected by the composition included Clare, which, under the name Thomond, was part of the Presidency of Connaught from 1569 until about 1600. (Note: About 1600 Clare was removed from the presidency of Connaught and made a presidency in its own right under the Earl of Thomond. When Henry O'Brien, 5th Earl of Thomond died in 1639, Lord Deputy Thomas Wentworth, 1st Earl of Strafford decreed Clare should return to the presidency of Munster, but the Wars of the Three Kingdoms delayed this until the Restoration.)

== Charges ==
Prior to the composition, a landholder was liable to pay various charges: to the English a cess to cover the cost of the garrisons; and to the Gaelic chief coyne and livery for his private army, and "cuttings" and "coshery" for his household. These were to be replaced with a fixed annual rent of 10 shillings per quarter (Note: A quarter, notionally 120 Irish acres, varied in size depending on land quality, and usually approximated the townlands standardised in the 19th century.) of inhabited land payable to the Presidency, plus a variable Composition rent payable to the local chief. Some lands, termed "freedoms", were exempt from Composition rent.

== Title ==
The Composition book recorded the names of the holders of many quarters, together with the amount of rent to which they would be liable. Later generations assumed that this amounted to a proof of title to the land for the heirs of those named. This assumption was denied in the 1630s by Thomas Wentworth, 1st Earl of Strafford. Following the Civil wars of the 1640s, land in Connacht was again reassigned as part of the Cromwellian conquest of Ireland.

== People ==
The following people were either members of the Commission, signatories of the composition, or both:

Name	Role	Commissioner?	Signatory?
Richard Bingham	Chief Commissioner; Governor of Connacht	Y	
Edward Waterhouse	Chancellor of the Exchequer of Ireland	Y	
Nicholas White	Master of the Rolls in Ireland	Y	
Charles Calthorpe	Attorney-General for Ireland	Y	
Thomas Lestrange	MP for County Galway	Y	
Thomas Dillon	Chief Justice of Connacht	Y	
Gerald Comerford	Attorney-general of Connacht	Y	
William Ó Mullally	Archbishop of Tuam	Y	Y
Stephen Kirwan	Bishop of Clonfert	Y	
John Lynch	Bishop of Elphin	Y	
Owen O'Connor	Bishop-elect of Killala (Note: O'Connor was Dean of Achonry and described as "bishop-elect of Killala". Until he was formally appointed in 1591, the see of Killala was technically vacant.)		Y
Eugene O'Hart	Bishop of Achonry		Y
Francis Barkley	Provost-Marshal of Connaught	Y	
Nicholas Fitz Symons	Alderman on Dublin Corporation	Y	
Thomas Butler	Earl of Ormond	Y	
Ulick Burke	Earl of Clanricarde	Y	Y
Edmond de Bermingham	Baron Athenry	Y	
Sir Tirrelagh O'Brien	Seneschal of Corcomroe and Burren	Y	
Donell O'Connor Sligo	O'Connor Sligo	Y	Y
Brian O'Rourke	Lord of West Breifne	Y	
Risdeárd Bourke	Mac William Íochtar	Y	Y
Murrough na dTuadh Ó Flaithbheartaigh	Chief of Iar Connacht	Y	Y
John Marbury	MP for County Sligo	Y	
Robert Fowle	Barkley's successor as Provost-Marshal of Connaught	Y	
John Browne	Sheriff of County Mayo	Y	
Donogh O'Brien	Earl of Thomond		Y
Margaret Cusack	Wife of Murrough O'Brien, 4th Baron Inchiquin (Note: Margaret Cusack is described as having signed "in the name of the young Baron of Inchequin, her son"; in fact, her husband was still living, while their son Dermod was not born until 1594.)		Y
