= Thomas Lestrange (1518–1590) =

English official in Ireland

Sir Thomas Lestrange
- Born: 1518
- Died: 14 March 1590 (aged 71–72)
- Other names: Le Strange, Le Straunge, Strange
- Occupations: official and landowner
- Known for: during the Tudor conquest of Ireland
- Spouse: Margaret Bath (or Bathe) (m. 1557)
- Children: two daughters

Sir Thomas Lestrange (1518 – 14 March 1590), also Le Strange, Le Straunge, or Strange, was an English official in the Presidency of Connaught and landowner during the Tudor conquest of Ireland. He was one of the seven sons of Sir Thomas Le Strange of Hunstanton in Norfolk and Anne Vaux, daughter of Nicholas Vaux, 1st Baron Vaux of Harrowden, and like his brothers Nicholas and Richard, the younger Thomas went to Ireland. By 1557 he was sub-constable of Athlone Castle and in 1559 became sheriff of Westmeath.

In 1565 he gained two crown leases in County Westmeath: one of 21 years for the lands of the dissolved abbey of Lough Sewdy, the other of 37 years for lands of the attainted Sir Oliver FitzGerald. He used his official positions to acquire lands in counties Galway, Roscommon, and Longford, and at his death owned "30 quarters of land in the territory of Clankerno" [Clann Ceithearnaigh, or Ciarraige Aí]. Lestrange had a castle called Castlereogh near Athleague, in what is now the townland of Castlestrange in the civil parish of Fuerty, County Roscommon.

In 1569 Lestrange was made constable of Roscommon Castle by Henry Sidney. He led the garrison defending Loughrea Castle in a 1577 siege during the Mac an Iarla War. In August 1584 John Perrot appointed him knight bachelor and member of the Privy Council of Ireland. In 1585 Lestrange was a commissioner in the Composition of Connacht and member of the Irish Parliament for County Galway, and deputed for Richard Bingham as Lord President of Connaught. He held the Aran Islands for a few years but in 1588 his title was ruled to be defective, although he stayed on as tenant of the new proprietor, Thomas Butler, 10th Earl of Ormond.

In 1557 Lestrange married Margaret Bath (or Bathe), widow of Nicholas Shane (or Shaen). Her existing children included Francis Shane, Thomas' fellow MP in 1585; Alice, who married Thomas Dillon, later a judge and Chief Justice of Connacht; and Katherine, who married Thomas FitzGerald, son of the aforementioned Sir Oliver. Thomas Lestrange and Margaret had two surviving daughters and no sons. His heirs were two sons of his late brother Richard — Thomas, who acquired Castlestrange, and Richard — and one William Anderson.
