= Thomas Lestrange =

Thomas Lestrange may refer to:

- Sir Thomas Le Strange (c.1490–1545)
- Sir Thomas Lestrange (1518–1590), his son, English official and landowner during the Tudor conquest of Ireland
