= Ralph Rokeby (died 1596) =

English barrister and judge

Ralph Rokeby (c. 1527–1596) was an English barrister and judge who held high office in Ireland.

He was born at Mortham in Yorkshire, the second son of Thomas Rokeby of Rokeby Hall, Rokeby (died 1567) and his wife Jane Constable; Jane was the daughter of Sir Robert Constable of Cliffe, Selby, who was executed in 1537 for his part in the Pilgrimage of Grace, and his wife Jane Ingleby. Christopher Rokeby (died 1584), the soldier and spy, was his elder brother. Ralph was educated at the University of Cambridge and Lincoln's Inn, where he was called to the Bar.

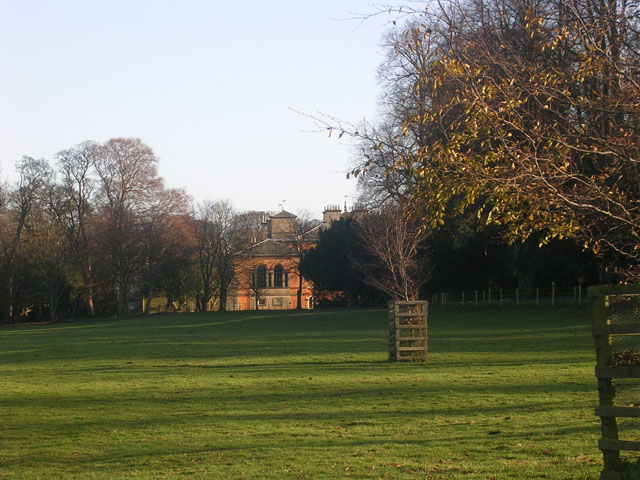
Rokeby Hall

He was first sent to Ireland by Queen Elizabeth I in 1566; he was recalled to England early in 1569. What tasks he had been entrusted with on his first Irish mission are unclear. At the end of 1569 he returned to Ireland, and was appointed the first Chief Justice of Connacht, with the task of introducing the system of common law into the Province of Connacht. He found it a discouraging task, writing to Lord Burghley that the people of Connacht "were unwilling to embrace justice". What was needed, in his view, was the subjugation of the province by the military forces, led by "valiant and courageous captains": if this did not happen, and quickly, then the English must soon bid "farewell to Ireland". Powers to impose martial law in the province and to pursue the King's enemies with "fire and sword" were eventually granted to the Chief Justice's superior, the Lord President of Connaught in 1604, some years after Rokeby's death.

Rokeby earned the good regard of Adam Loftus, the Lord Chancellor of Ireland, and of MP William FitzWilliam, the Lord Deputy of Ireland, both of whom suggested that he might in due course replace Loftus as Lord Chancellor. He returned to England for good in about 1577 and became Master of Requests about 1586. He was also employed on several commissions for the detection of recusants and traitors, including those which indicted William Parry and Anthony Babington. He sat as a judge at numerous treason trials, notably those of Philip, Earl of Arundel, Sir John Perrot, Dr Lopez and Patrick O'Collun. He was a Bencher of Lincoln's Inn and Master of St Katherine's Hospital near the Tower of London. He was made a member of the Council of the North, on the nomination of the veteran Yorkshire statesman Sir Thomas Gargrave.

He died on 14 June 1596 and was buried in St Andrew, Holborn. He never married, though since he obtained leave of absence to return to England for his wedding, he was then clearly intending to do so; nothing seems to be known of the intended bride. Although he had several siblings, including Christopher, he chose to leave his property instead to a variety of charities. His estate was considerable: Lord Ellesmere, Lord Chancellor of England, the executor and residuary legatee, is said to have received £10000 as his share.

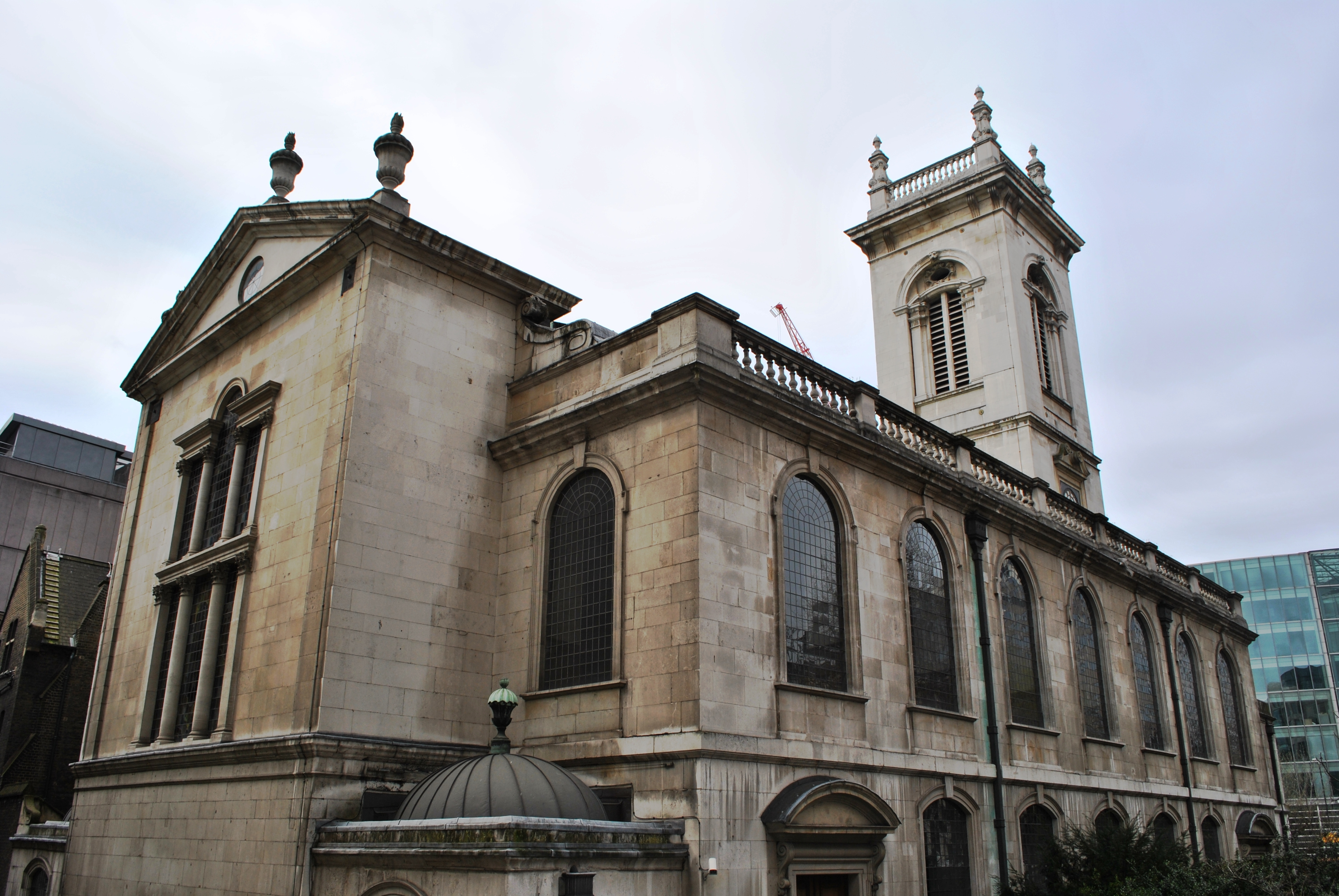
Church of St Andrew, Holborn, where Ralph is buried

A Ralph Rokeby represented Huntingdon in the English Parliament of 1571, and has been tentatively identified with this man. However, there is no firm evidence for this identification, and it is equally likely to have been his relative, Ralph Rokeby (died 1595), a lawyer and historian.
