= Richard Osbaldeston (Attorney General) =

English barrister (c.1585 – 1640)

Sir Richard Osbaldeston (c.1585 – 1640) was an English barrister who became Attorney General for Ireland. He was the great-grandfather of Richard Osbaldeston, Bishop of London.

== Background and early career ==
He was born in Lancashire, probably at Sefton. His father, Edward Osbaldeston (died 1639), belonged to an ancient Lancashire family, the Osbaldestons of Osbaldeston Hall. Edward's father, the youngest son of a large family, made an advantageous marriage to Margaret Molyneux, daughter of Sir Richard Molyneux, 1st Baronet and Frances Gerard. Margaret's father was head of the family which later acquired the title Earl of Sefton, and her mother was a daughter of the prominent judge Sir Gilbert Gerard, Master of the Rolls. They were also related to the Earl of Derby, and profited from this connection. By the 1620s Richard was rich enough to buy the Manor of Hunmanby in Yorkshire, where the family remained until they died out in the 1830s.

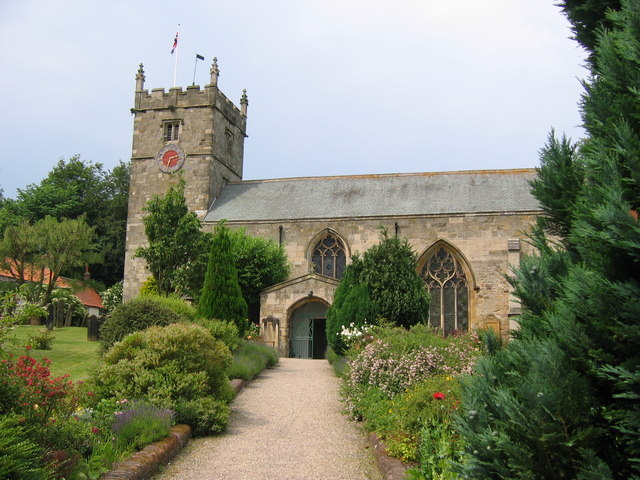
All Saints' Church, Hunmanby- Richard's family were the local landowners here for centuries

Richard entered Gray's Inn in 1604 and was called to the Bar there. He was Reader of Gray's Inn in 1625, and its Treasurer in 1635. While his practice was undoubtedly lucrative, few details of his career as a barrister survive, but it is likely that he practised in York, where he was living at the time of his first marriage in 1612.

== Attorney General ==
In 1636 he was knighted and sent to Ireland as the Irish Attorney General: he already had a link with the Irish judiciary through his cousin Geoffrey Osbaldeston, Chief Justice of Connacht (died c.1635) who had a long if undistinguished record of service to the Crown as a judge in Ireland. Richard is said to have been a close associate of the Lord Deputy of Ireland, Thomas Wentworth, 1st Earl of Strafford, a fellow Yorkshireman, who may have known him in his younger days. Wentworth frequently consulted him on legal points, but given the Lord Deputy's overwhelming personality and his total control of the Irish government, it is unlikely that any legal adviser had much influence over him. There were also family ties between the two men, which were strengthened when Richard's son William married Strafford's cousin Anne Wentworth, the daughter of Sir George Wentworth of Woolley Hall, West Yorkshire.

== Quo warranto campaign ==
It was Wentworth who in 1638 instructed Osbaldeston to bring proceedings for quo warranto (i.e. a writ arguing that a person or public body is asserting a legal jurisdiction it does not possess, and requiring them to justify it) against those corporations in Munster which challenged the jurisdiction of the central Court of Admiralty; this was apparently at the request of Dr Alan Cooke, the Leinster Admiralty judge.

In 1639, the quo warranto campaign was extended into an attack on all local landowners who claimed the right to hold local Admiralty courts. The campaign was not entirely successful: the Court of Exchequer (Ireland) ruled that Richard Talbot of Malahide Castle (ancestor of Baron Talbot de Malahide) had the right to hold an admiralty court for the port of Malahide in north Dublin, which had been guaranteed to the Talbot family by the Crown. The campaign seems to have petered out after Osbaldeston's death.

== Death ==
Probably Osbaldeston's most lasting memorial was the house he built adjacent to the King's Inns. After his death it was regranted to his son William. It was later acquired by Sir Richard Reynell, 1st Baronet.

He died in Dublin in June 1640 and was buried in the Church of St. John the Evangelist, Dublin. Dr Cooke, the Admiralty judge, wrote to London with the terse message that "the old Attorney (General) is dead" and asked for a replacement to be sent quickly, to continue the quo warranto campaign. Osbaldeston was replaced by Sir Thomas Tempest, but Strafford's impeachment, followed by the outbreak of the Irish Rebellion of 1641, soon made the effective conduct of government business impossible and the office of Attorney General effectively lapsed until 1649.

== Family ==
He married firstly Eleanor Anne Westropp, daughter of William Westropp of Brunton, Yorkshire and Elizabeth Witham, who died in 1638, and secondly, Mary Nettleton, daughter of Thomas Nettleton of Nettleton Hall, Thornhill, West Yorkshire, who outlived him and died about 1652. By his first marriage he had at least five children, but of these only William and Frances are known to have reached adult life; Lambert, the eldest son, died young. The second son was William Osbaldeston MP (1631–1707), who was the grandfather of Richard Osbaldeston, Bishop of London.

While the Osbaldestons did not have any permanent ties with Ireland, the family of Richard's first wife did, becoming prominent landowners in County Clare and County Limerick. Mountiford Westropp, High Sheriff of Clare in 1698, was her nephew.

Legal offices
Preceded by William Ryves	Attorney-General for Ireland; 1636-1640	Succeeded by Thomas Tempest
