= Thomas Dillon (judge) =

Irish judge and landowner (c. 1535–1606)

- Born: c. 1535; Proudstown, County Meath, Ireland
- Died: 1606; Dublin, Ireland
- Burial place: Dublin
- Education: Inner Temple
- Occupation(s): Judge, Landowner
- Known for: Chief Justice of Connacht, Justice of the Court of Common Pleas (Ireland)
- Spouse: Alice Shaen
- Children: Robert, Jenet
- Parent: Richard Dillon (father)
- Relatives: Gerald Dillon (grandfather), Sir Robert Dillon (great-uncle), Sir Richard Bingham (brother-in-law)

Thomas Dillon (c. 1535 – 1606) was an Irish judge and landowner: his descendants held the title Baron Clonbrock.

He was born at Proudstown, near Navan, County Meath. He was a grandson of Gerald Dillon, whose elder brother Sir Robert Dillon founded the senior branch of the family which held the title Earl of Roscommon. Thomas's father, Richard Dillon (died 1565), son of Gerald and his wife Ellen Macrery, was a judge of the Court of Queen's Bench (Ireland).

He entered the Inner Temple in 1559. He was called to the Bar; he was a member of the King's Inns and had a chamber there. He briefly held office as justice of Wexford, then practised on the Connacht circuit. He became Chief Justice of Connacht in 1577, in which office he gained a reputation for integrity, and was suggested as a possible Lord Chief Justice of Ireland in 1582.

In 1593, despite the general rule that a provincial Chief Justiceship should not be combined with a seat on the High Court Bench, he became a justice of the Court of Common Pleas (Ireland). He continued to spend most of his time in Connacht, but in 1596 he clashed with his formidable superior, Sir Richard Bingham, the Lord President of Connaught, and was committed to Dublin Castle as a result. He was restored to favour the following year, after Bingham himself suffered temporary disgrace and fled to England. Thomas lived mainly at Curraghboy, County Roscommon; his property was ravaged during the Nine Years War. He died in 1606 and was buried in Dublin.

He married Alice Shaen (or Farrell), daughter of Nicholas Shaen and Margaret Bathe (or Bath), and sister of Sir Francis Shaen or Shane, ancestor of the Shaen Baronets. Her stepfather Sir Thomas Lestrange (died 1590) was Bingham's Deputy as Lord President of Connaught. They had at least one son Robert (died 1628), and a daughter Jenet, who married Sir John Bathe of Drumcondra, Dublin, a leading spokesman for the Roman Catholic community, by whom she had five children. Thomas's last direct male descendant was Robert Dillon, 5th Baron Clonbrock, who died in 1926.
