= Oliver Jones (judge) =

Oliver Jones (c. 1610-1682) was an Irish politician and judge of the seventeenth century, who was widely rumoured to have secret Roman Catholic sympathies, and was criticised for changing sides during the English Civil War.

He was born in Athlone, the third son of John Jones, a merchant, and Jane Messett. He was admitted to the King's Inns in 1638. He entered the Irish House of Commons as MP for Athlone in 1639. He was generally believed to have Roman Catholic sympathies, and as a result, he clashed with the Lord Lieutenant of Ireland, the Earl of Strafford and with Strafford's key ally Sir Richard Bolton, the Lord Chancellor of Ireland. After Strafford's downfall and death in 1641, Jones was active in the impeachment of Lord Chancellor Bolton. He belonged to the "moderate Protestant party" in the Commons (many of them lawyers like himself) who were anxious to find common ground with their Roman Catholic colleagues.

Amidst the general turmoil which followed the Irish Rebellion of 1641, he disappeared for a time from the records, and little is known of his activities until 1649, when he was appointed Attorney General for the province of Connacht. In 1652, despite his supposed Roman Catholic beliefs, he was prepared to swear an oath to be true and faithful to the Cromwellian regime. After the Restoration of Charles II, this was not held against him, since several of his colleagues on the Bench had also made their peace with Cromwell, and the restored Stuart dynasty was, within reason, prepared to overlook such disloyalty. He was restored to his old office of Attorney General for Connacht and returned to the House of Commons as member for County Roscommon. He was then living in Roscommon Castle. In 1662 he became Chief Justice of Connacht, and made a valuable ally in the Lord President of Connaught, Lord Berkeley. As a judge he was noted for willingness to give impartial justice to Roman Catholics, which no doubt fuelled the general belief that he was a Catholic himself.

In 1670, Lord Berkeley, during his relatively brief term as Lord Lieutenant, promoted Jones to a seat on the Court of Common Pleas (Ireland), and he was transferred in 1672 to the Court of King's Bench (Ireland). This promotion no doubt caused some comment in view of his known leaning towards Catholicism; but in post-Restoration Ireland, the religious atmosphere was relatively tolerant, especially in the early 1670s, and Jones was far from being the only High Court judge with Catholic leanings. He was even spoken of as a possible Lord Chief Justice of Ireland in 1673, although his religious beliefs probably did disqualify him on that occasion. He continued to go regularly as the judge of assize to Connacht.

He died in 1682 and was buried in St Patrick's Cathedral, Dublin. He was married with children, although little seems to be known of his family.
