= Alan Cooke (politician) =

- Occupations: Lawyer; judge

Alan Cooke (died after 1647) was a distinguished civilian lawyer and politician of the seventeenth century. Born in England, he spent many years in Ireland as the surrogate judge of the Irish Court of Admiralty. He also sat in the Irish House of Commons in two Parliaments, and for a time he was a figure of some political importance.

Little is known of his life before 1628. He was always referred to as Dr. Cooke, which suggests that he had a doctorate in civil law. He also had the nickname "Alan Pouke", whose meaning is lost.

== Judge ==
By 1628 he was in Dublin, acting as surrogate to the Irish Admiralty judge, who was also the Lord Chancellor of Ireland, Adam Loftus, 1st Viscount Loftus. The English Crown thought very highly of Cooke, calling him a lawyer "not inferior to any other in his profession of the civil law", and a man who had given "special service to his Majesty" in the Court of Admiralty. It was strongly suggested that he should be made the full-time judge of the Court of Admiralty, rather than remain as deputy to Lord Chancellor Loftus. After Loftus's downfall and disgrace in 1638, the Crown instead left his place in the Court of Admiralty vacant. Cooke on his own petition was appointed the permanent Admiralty judge for the province of Leinster in the same year, a position he held till 1647. He also became a Master in the Court of Chancery (Ireland).

The Crown's high opinion of Cooke seems to have been justified: he was both an able judge and a very conscientious one, who continued to perform his functions even amidst the political turmoil of the 1640s.

He clashed with the municipal corporations over their insistence that they had jurisdiction in Admiralty cases (this had been a source of conflict since the Irish Court of Admiralty was first set up in the 1570s). He was apparently the moving force behind a series of quo warranto cases against them, requiring them to justify their supposed power to hear Admiralty cases, which were brought in the late 1630s by Richard Osbaldeston, the Attorney General for Ireland. Osbaldeston's death in 1640 brought the campaign to curb the corporations' powers to an end. It was Cooke who wrote to the English Government informing them in unemotional terms of the Attorney General's death, and asking for him to be replaced at once, partly to continue the quo warranto campaign. In the political turmoil which engulfed Ireland in the following year the office of Attorney General simply lapsed, and the quo warranto campaign lapsed with it.

Cooke also had a serious clash with the judges of the Irish courts of common law over a series of instructions issued by the English Privy Council in 1633 preventing the High Court judges in any Admiralty case from issuing a writ of prohibition, which would prevent the Admiralty judge from dealing with the case. Originally issued to the English judges only, in 1638 the instructions were explicitly extended to their Irish colleagues as well. The Irish judges were naturally infuriated at this removal of one of their crucial powers, and Cooke, although he was the beneficiary of the instructions, which bolstered his own authority, rightly feared that he would be the target for the judges' revenge: "the judges were bitter against the Admiralty, and no wonder". In 1638 Cooke and one of his deputies, Richard Hatton, were arrested and questioned by the Irish Privy Council, on which all the judges had seats: Hatton was imprisoned and Cooke was fined. The pretext for the council's action was an alleged irregularity in Cooke's handling of a salvage case, but no one doubted that the real cause was the judges' bitterness about the Privy Council instructions.

== Politics ==
He entered politics, probably at the wish of the Lord Lieutenant of Ireland, Thomas Wentworth, 1st Earl of Strafford, whose policy it was to build up a "Court party" in the Parliament of Ireland, made up of courtiers and officials, preferably of English birth, whom he trusted. Cooke represented Cavan Borough in the Parliaments of 1634-5 and 1639–49.

After the downfall and execution for treason of Strafford in 1640–41, Cooke was for a short time a political figure of some importance. He was one of the leaders of the moderate Protestant party, who pursued a policy of compromise and sought to find common ground with their Roman Catholic colleagues. The outbreak of the Irish Rebellion of 1641 ruined the hopes of the moderate party.

Cooke retired from public life in 1647, and was replaced as Admiralty judge for Leinster by William Hilton. His date of death is not recorded.

== Sources ==
- Costello, Kevin The Court of Admiralty of Ireland 1575-1893 Four Courts Dublin 2011
- Dudley Edwards, R.W. and O'Dowd, Mary Sources for Modern Irish History 1534-1641 Cambridge University Press 1985
- Perceval-Maxwell, M. The Outbreak of the Irish Rebellion of 1641 McGill-Queens University Press Montreal 1994
- Wedgwood, C.V. Thomas Wentworth, 1st Earl of Strafford 1593-1641 A Revaluation Phoenix Press reissue 2000
