= Geoffrey Osbaldeston =

Member of the Parliament of England

Geoffrey Osbaldeston (1558-c.1635) was an English-born politician and judge who had a long but rather undistinguished career in Ireland.

He was the third son of Edward Osbaldeston of Osbaldeston Hall, a member of an old and prominent Lancashire family, and Maud, daughter of Sir Thomas Halsall. The Osbaldestons were related to the Stanleys, Earls of Derby, and Edward seems to have owed his success to their patronage. Edward Osbaldeston, the Roman Catholic martyr, was his first cousin. He was educated at St Mary Hall, Oxford and entered Gray's Inn in 1577, becoming an Ancient of the Inn (a senior rank, though junior to Reader) in 1593. He sat in the House of Commons of England as member for Newton in the Parliament of 1597-8.

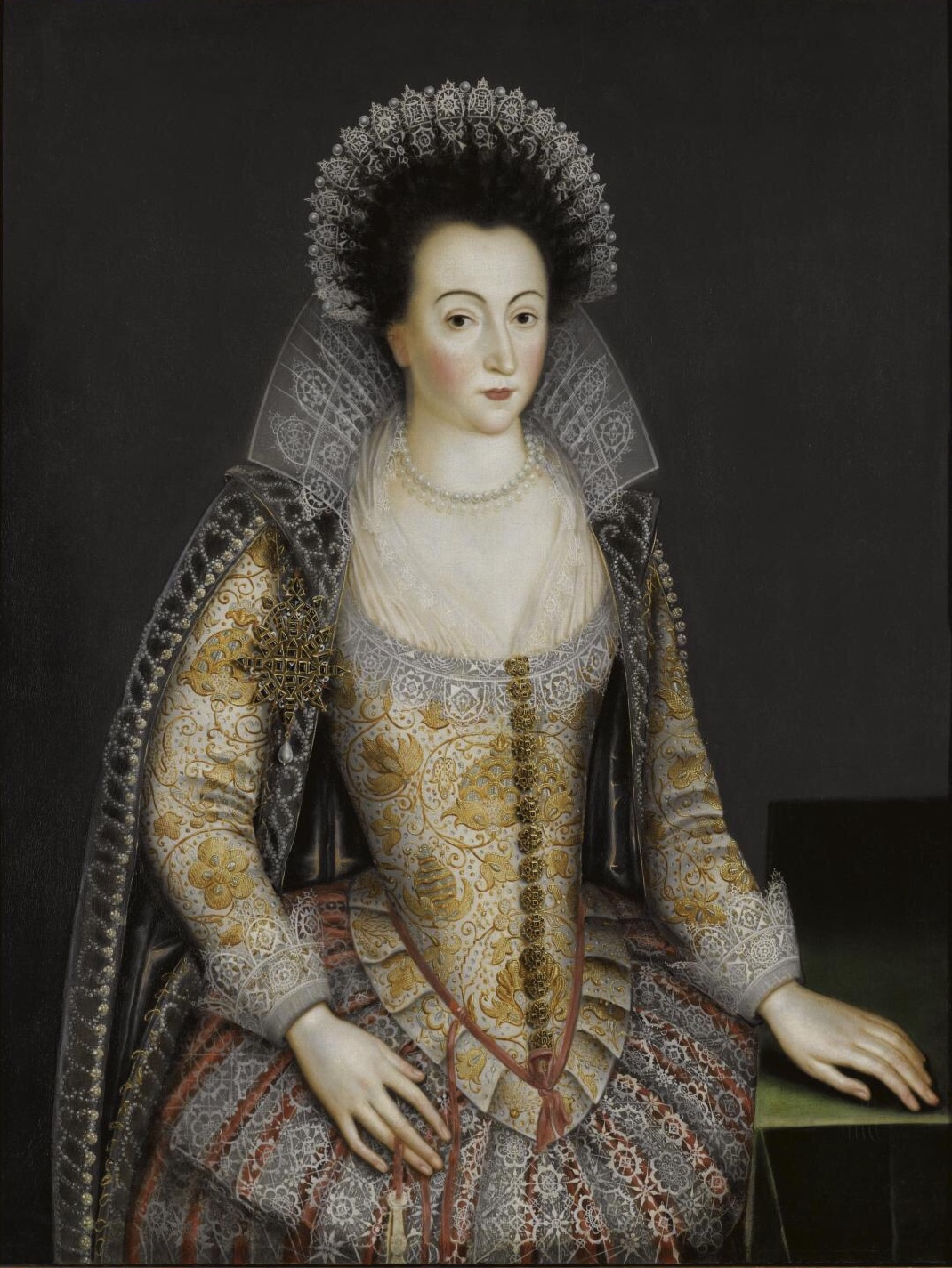
Portrait tentatively identified as Alice, Countess of Derby, by an unknown artist. Geoffrey owed much to her patronage.

In 1601 Alice, Countess of Derby, who acted as his patroness, lobbied on his behalf to obtain an official position for him in Ireland. In 1605 he was sent there as a justice of the Court of King's Bench (Ireland). He was certainly not the Crown's first choice, being a last minute replacement for Lewis Prowde, a barrister with a much better reputation for legal ability, who was nominated for the position but never took up office, apparently due to chronic ill-health (Prowde later became a judge in Wales, and an MP in the Addled Parliament of 1614). Unfortunately for Osbaldeston's future career prospects the Lord Deputy of Ireland, Sir Arthur Chichester, soon formed a very poor view of his efficiency, and within two years he was moved to the office of Chief Justice of Connacht; a step which was generally seen as a demotion on the ground of his professional incompetence. He served on a number of Crown commissions and wrote a report on the state of Galway City in 1626. He retired in 1634; his precise date of death does not seem to be recorded.

He married Lucy (or Louisa) Warren, youngest daughter of John Warren of Poynton in Cheshire and his wife Margaret Molyneux and had three children. Through his daughter Deborah he was the ancestor of the prominent Lyster family of County Roscommon. Richard Osbaldeston, Attorney General for Ireland, was a cousin of Geoffrey's of the next generation.

== Notes ==
Parliament of England
Preceded by Edmund Trafford; Robert Langton	Member of Parliament for Newton; 1597–1601; With: William Cope	Succeeded by Thomas Langton; Richard Ashton
