= Lewis Prowde =

English barrister, judge and politician

Lewis Prowde (c.1560-1617) was an English barrister, judge and politician, who sat in the House of Commons as MP for Shrewsbury in the Addled Parliament of 1614.

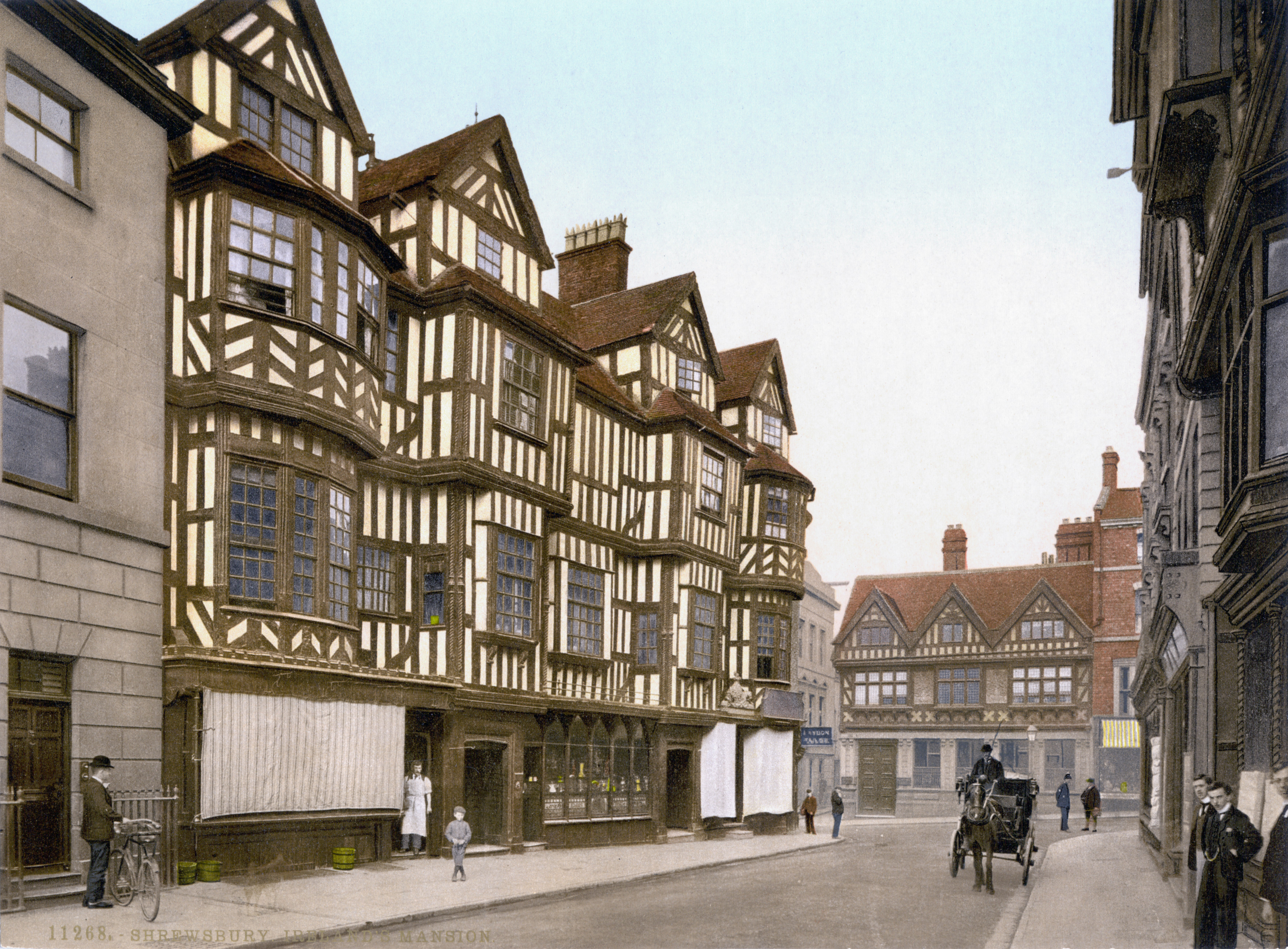
Shrewsbury: the Prowdes were a long-established family of drapers here

He was born in Shrewsbury, eldest son of George Prowde (died 1591) and Eleanor Lewis. Though he came from an established family of drapers and cloth merchants, he decided on a career in the law. After attending Shrewsbury Grammar School, he matriculated from St. John's College, Cambridge in 1576. He entered Furnivall's Inn, and then Lincoln's Inn in 1578. He was called to the Bar in 1586. He became a figure of considerable importance in Lincoln's Inn, where he was successively made Bencher in 1602 (an unusually early appointment as he had only 16 years practice at the Bar), Reader, Keeper of the Black Book, and finally Treasurer in 1613-14. He built up a lucrative legal practice and had the name of being a fine lawyer. He became standing counsel to the Dean of Westminster in about 1587, and steward of the lands of Westminster Abbey. He moved permanently to London some years after his father's death, though his old home remained in the family. He also leased a manor at Westbury, Wiltshire.

In 1604, he was nominated as a justice of the Court of King's Bench (Ireland), but his patent of appointment never took effect. Most likely he refused to take up the position, about which he had not been consulted in advance, due to his increasing health problems (he was seriously ill in 1605, and unable to act as Reader of his Inn). The Crown with some reluctance appointed the incompetent Geoffrey Osbaldeston instead in 1605.

Despite his increasing ill health, Prowde in 1610 became a junior judge of the North Wales circuit, an appointment which, according to the customs of the time, allowed him to continue in private practice. He entered Parliament in 1614, but the single session of the notorious Addled Parliament, which was dissolved after only two months, having passed no legislation, was too short for him to make any impression.

His increasing eminence as a lawyer meant that a seat on the High Court would almost certainly have come his way but for his premature death. He died early in 1617 and was buried in Westminster Abbey.

He married in 1590 Ursula Trappes, daughter of Francis Trappes, goldsmith of London and Anne Barnard or Byrnand of Knaresborough, and had three children, including Thomas. The marriage was a most advantageous one for Prowde, since his mother-in-law was not only a rich woman in her own right, but had married as her third husband Sir John Egerton of Oundle, a member of the powerful Egerton family, who by his death in 1614 had become one of the leading politicians in Cheshire and Staffordshire. He fostered Prowde's career (he was probably responsible for Prowde being appointed a Bencher of Lincoln's Inn at an unusually early date)), and Prowde in return had Egerton made an honorary member of Lincoln's Inn in 1602. Ursula survived until 1640. She is buried in St. Margaret's, Westminster, adjacent to the Abbey.

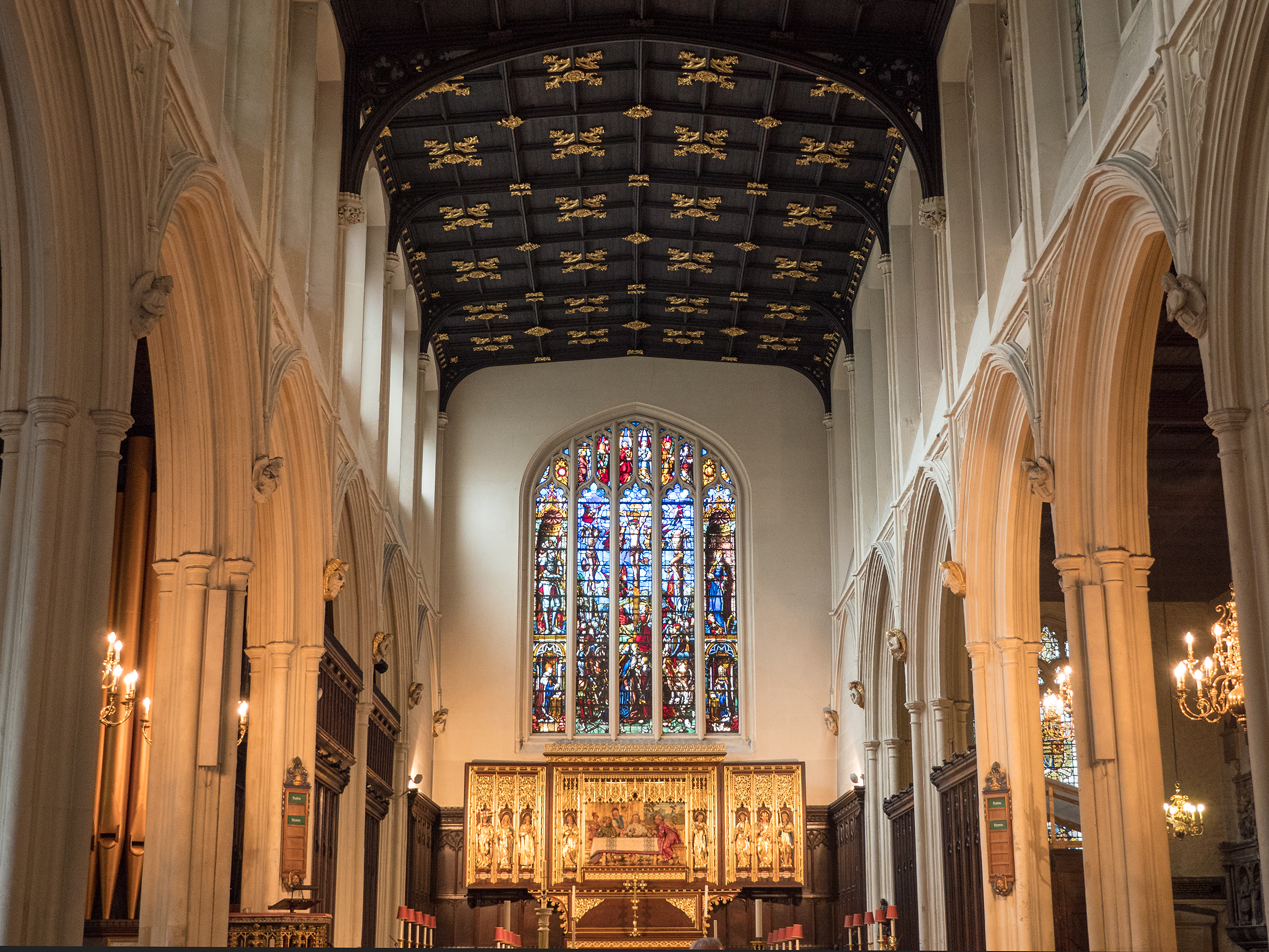
St Margaret's, Westminster
