= William Osbaldeston (died 1707) =

English politician

William Osbaldeston (1631–1707) was an English politician who served as Member of Parliament for Scarborough.

Osbaldeston was the son of Sir Richard Osbaldeston, Attorney-General for Ireland, and his wife Eleanor, daughter of William Westropp. His father had bought the manor of Hunmanby, Yorkshire, of which the family remained lords of the manor for centuries.

William was born in York, and baptised at St Martin's, Coney Street on 10 June 1631. He was educated at Otley Grammar School, and was admitted to Christ's College, Cambridge and Gray's Inn, both in 1647, and to King's Inns in Dublin in 1654.

In Yorkshire, Osbaldeston served as a justice of the peace, a commissioner, and a deputy lieutenant. He was nominated an alderman in Scarborough in 1684, and elected MP for Scarborough at the 1685 general election. The History of Parliament describes him as a "totally inactive Member". In 1687, King James II demanded that all justices of the peace answer whether they would consent to the repeal of the Test Act and Penal Laws, as the king wished; Osbaldeston gave evasive answers, was removed as deputy lieutenant, and is not known to have stood for Parliament again.

He was buried at Hunmanby on 6 October 1707.

== Family ==
Osbaldeston married Anne, daughter of Sir George Wentworth MP. They had two sons and four daughters:

- Richard (1655–1728), knighted in 1681, married (1) Frances Strickland, (2) Elizabeth Fountayne, (3) Catherine Hassell
- Anne (1656–1746), married (1) 1676 Sir Matthew Wentworth [2nd Baronet, his 3rd wife], (2) 1680 Sir William Hustler MP
- Elizabeth (1658–1693/4), married 1677 Sir Matthew Wentworth [3rd Baronet]
- Charles (died 1660), died in infancy
- Everald (born 1662), married 1689 Richard Norris
- Eleanor (1664–1665), died in infancy
