= William Hilton (Irish politician) =

Irish politician (died 1651)

William Hilton (died 1651) was an Irish politician, barrister and judge. He is now mainly remembered for his family connection to James Ussher, Archbishop of Armagh, whose sister Anne he married, and who furthered his career.

== Early life ==
His parentage and early life are obscure, but he is thought to have been born in Lifford, County Donegal, where the Hilton family were prominent in local affairs. George Hilton, a freeman of Lifford, may have been his cousin. George is recorded as leasing an estate at Lifford in 1616 from the original proprietor, the London-born builder and architect Peter Benson, who built the Walls of Derry and played a prominent role in the Plantation of Ulster. William later lived at the Abbey, Navan, County Meath.

He is first heard of as a student in the King's Inns in 1608, when he was described as an attorney of the Common Bench (an old name for the Court of Common Pleas). In 1613-14 he received a patent from the King's Inns describing him as a counsellor at law, which entitled him to practice at the Irish Bar. His later career suggests that he had considerable knowledge of civil law as well as common law. He was in England, studying law, at Gray's Inn in 1616. He became a Bencher of the King's Inns in 1628 and was elected Treasurer of the Inns in 1640.

== Judge ==
By 1626 he had been appointed judge of the Irish Prerogative Court, which dealt with probate cases. William probably owed his appointment to Archbishop Ussher, who as Archbishop of Dublin was the nominal head of the Prerogative Court, and whose sister Anne he married in 1626. He became Attorney General to the Chief Justice of Connacht in the same year, and held that office until 1637.

He entered politics, and flourished as a client of the formidable and almost all-powerful Lord Lieutenant of Ireland, Thomas Wentworth, 1st Earl of Strafford, who became a friend of William's brother-in-law the Archbishop. No doubt at Stafford's prompting he sat in the Irish House of Commons as MP for Armagh in the Parliament of 1634-5.

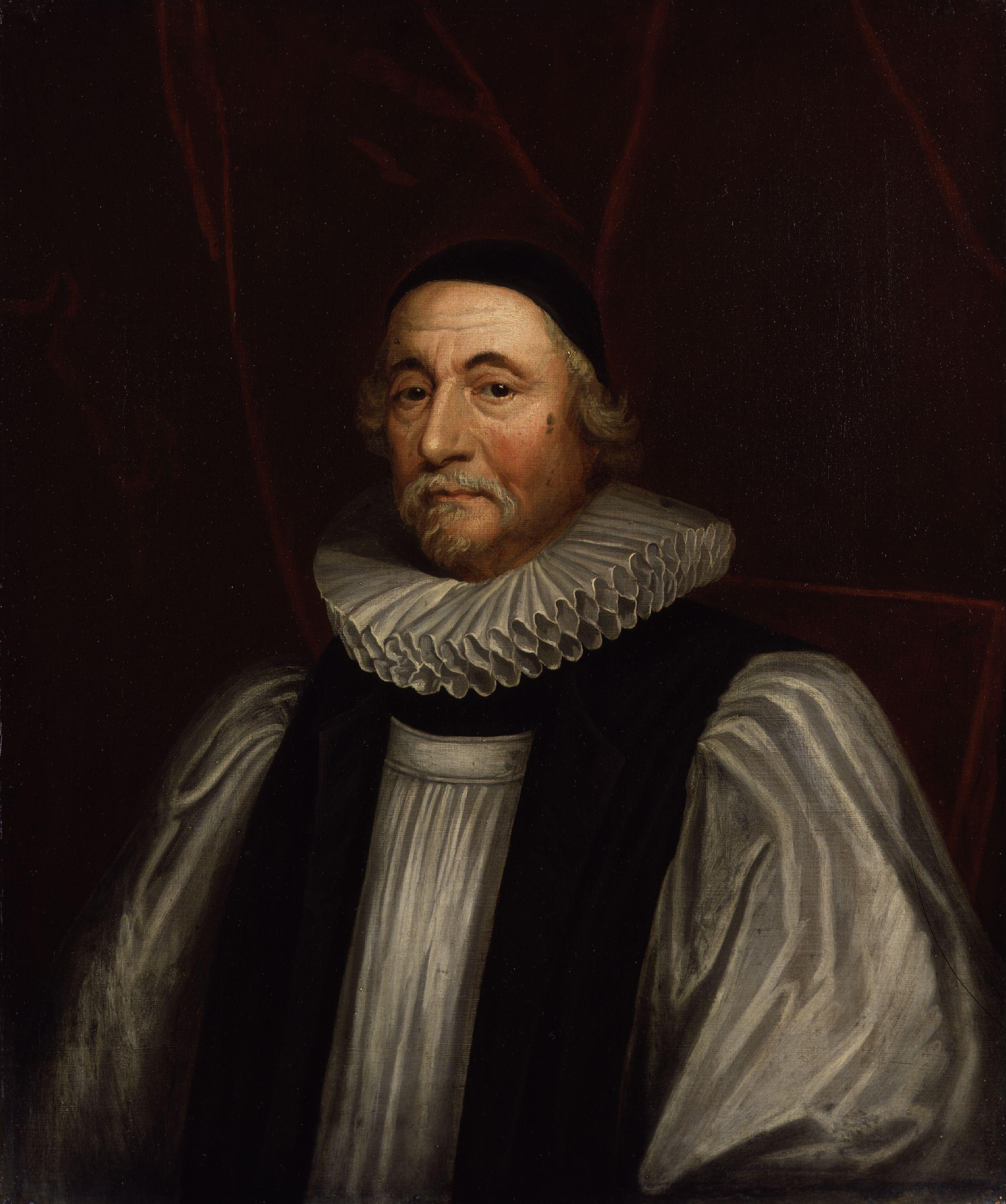
James Ussher, Archbishop of Armagh, Hilton's brother-in-law and benefactor

In 1638, on Strafford's nomination, he became third Baron of the Court of Exchequer (Ireland). Stafford's downfall and execution for treason in 1641 does not seem to have affected William's career, but by 1642 conditions in Ireland had become so disturbed that he complained that he was the only Baron still sitting in the Court of Exchequer, and applied for an increase in salary to take account of the extra workload. This was apparently refused, but perhaps by way of compensation, he was appointed a judge of the Court of Common Pleas (Ireland) in 1644, his patent specifically allowing him to hold both offices together. He was briefly Keeper of the Great Seal of Ireland in 1648, before being replaced by Sir Robert Meredyth, who was Chancellor of the Exchequer of Ireland for many years. In addition, he was an acting judge of the Irish Court of Admiralty (there was no full-time Irish Admiralty judge after 1638). He had been acting judge of the provincial Admiralty courts of Ulster and Connacht since 1635, and in 1647 he replaced his predecessor Dr. Alan Cooke, whose deputy he had been, as the Admiralty judge for Leinster. He also went as a judge of assize to the North-west of Ireland, when political conditions there permitted.

He was a conscientious judge, who like his predecessor Dr Cooke continued to hear cases in the Admiralty Court in Dublin, even during the gravely disturbed conditions of the 1640s. Costello states that a salvage case, Macredie v Staples, in which he gave judgment in the plaintiff's favour in 1647, gives a useful glimpse of the routine work of the Irish Admiralty.

== Death and reputation ==
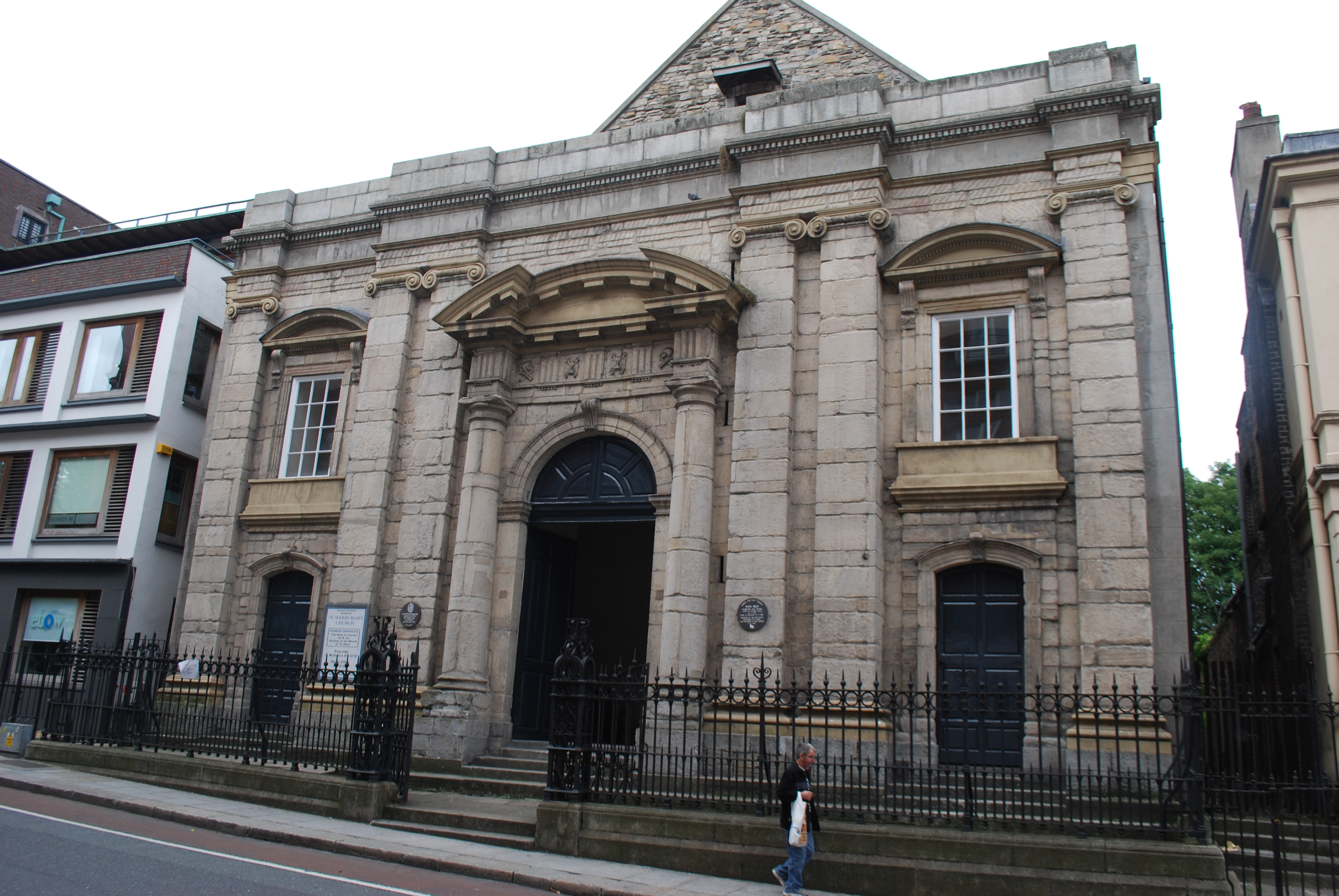
St Werburgh's Church, where Hilton and his wife Anne were buried

He died in 1651 and was buried in St Werburgh's Church, Dublin. His widow Anne died soon afterwards and was buried beside him. They had no children.

He appears to have been a lawyer of some ability and was a very conscientious judge, but historians agree that his rise to eminence was due entirely to his marriage into the Ussher family, and later to Strafford's patronage.

== Sources ==
- Ball, F. Elrington The Judges in Ireland 1221-1921 London John Murray 1926
- Costello, Kevin The Court of Admiralty of Ireland 1575-1893 Dublin Four Courts Press 2011
- Kearney, Hugh F. Strafford in Ireland 1633-41: a Study in Absolutism Manchester University Press 1959
- Kenny, Colum King's Inns and the Kingdom of Ireland Dublin Irish Academic Press 1992
- Smyth, Constantine Joseph Chronicle of the Law Officers of Ireland London Butterworths 1839
