= Richard Bingham (soldier) =

English soldier and naval commander (1528–1599)

Sir Richard Bingham
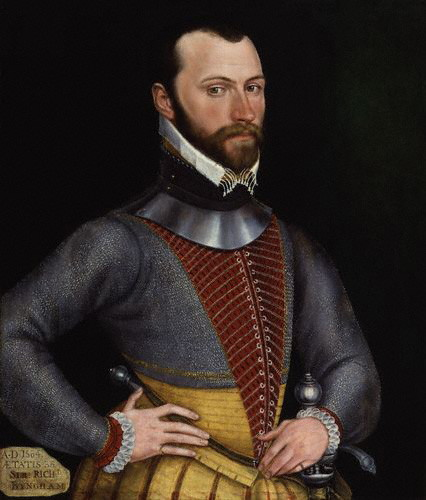
- 1564 portrait by an unknown artist

Lord President of Connaught
- In office 1584–1597
- Monarch: Elizabeth I
- Preceded by: Nicholas Malby
- Succeeded by: Conyers Clifford

Member of Parliament for County Roscommon
- In office 26 April 1585 – 14 May 1586
- Succeeded by: Sir John King

Marshal of Ireland
- In office August 1598 – 19 January 1599
- Preceded by: Henry Bagenal
- Succeeded by: Richard Wingfield

Personal details
- Born: 1528 Dorset, England
- Died: 19 January 1599 (aged 70) Dublin, Ireland
- Spouse: Sarah Heigham
- Children: Martha Bingham
- Profession: Soldier, Naval Commander

Military service
- Allegiance: England
- Branch/service: Royal Navy; English Army
- Years of service: 1547–1599
- Rank: Commander
- Battles/wars: The Rough Wooing; Fourth Ottoman–Venetian War; Battle of Lepanto; Eighty Years' War; Battle of Rijmenam; Tudor conquest of Ireland; Second Desmond Rebellion; Spanish Armada; Nine Years' War

Sir Richard Bingham (1528 – 19 January 1599) was an English soldier and naval commander. He served under Queen Elizabeth I during the Tudor conquest of Ireland and was appointed governor of Connacht.

== Early life and military career ==
Bingham was born in Dorset to Richard Bingham and his wife Alice Coker, daughter of Thomas Coker, and was the eldest of three brothers. Little is known of his early life, but he had embarked upon a military career before turning twenty, despite his small stature. He took part in Protector Somerset's Scottish expedition in 1547. A decade later, he served with the Spanish against the French at the Battle of St. Quentin. In October of the following year, 1558, he took part in a naval expedition in the Western Isles in Scotland.

In the Fourth Ottoman–Venetian War, Bingham fought under John of Austria (Don Juan de Austria) on the side of the Spaniards and Venetians. During this campaign, he was engaged in efforts to save the island of Cyprus, and at the crucial naval Battle of Lepanto on 7 October 1571. The next two years were spent in the Low Countries, relaying intelligence to the queen's principal secretary, Lord Burghley. In 1576 he attempted peace negotiations with Don Juan on behalf of the Estates General and, when the negotiations failed, fought valiantly for his employers at the Battle of Rijmenam. In the same year, 1578, the queen granted him an annuity of 50 marks in recognition of his military and diplomatic services.

== Naval expeditions ==
In 1579, Bingham was sent to Ireland to aid in the suppression of the Second Desmond Rebellion. In September the following year he served as captain of the Swiftsure under Admiral William Winter, and in the course of that expedition took part in the massacre at Smerwick of hundreds of Italian and Spanish troops who had surrendered to the English, an event on which he reported to another of the queen's secretaries, Francis Walsingham.

In September 1583, Bingham was given a commission to apprehend pirates in the narrow seas; the queen told Burghley to instruct him to seize Dutch ships for debts due to her, under the colour of looking for pirates.

== Governor of Connacht ==
In 1584 Bingham was appointed governor of the Irish province of Connacht, an office which led him into great controversy for the rest of his career. His brothers George and John were assistant commissioners, and he himself was knighted by Lord Deputy Perrot at Dublin Castle on 12 July 84. The 1585 Composition of Connacht aimed to regularise payment of cess by the Gaelic lords. But by 1586, Connacht had gone into general rebellion. At the Galway assizes early in the year, Bingham presided at court, when over 70 death sentences for disloyalty to the crown were passed. Later in the year, he took Castle Cloonoan in County Clare after a seven-day siege and had the O'Brien owner shot and put the garrison to the sword.

The principal agitators of the rebellion in Connacht were the MacWilliam Burke clan of County Mayo. Bingham entered their territory in March, taking Castlehag in Lough Mask, and agreed to withdraw his forces only if the men of the country prosecuted the rebels. In 1585 he took three young Burkes, Ulick, Richard and William aged fourteen, nine and seven. They were kept as hostages and then hanged in Ballinrobe. D'alton gives a harrowing account of the hangings. Perrot then granted a 3-month protection for the rebels, in return for pledges, and decided that the title of the MacWilliam should be abolished. In July the Burkes rose out again with even more adherents and sent men to Ulster to engage the Scots. In a provocative move, Perrot usurped Bingham's authority by forbidding him from moving against them, and the rebel numbers doubled to 800. Bingham assembled his army at Ballinrobe in mid-July, and by the end of the month, the rebel Burkes were ready to submit on the terms offered by him.

The costs of the rebellion were covered by cattle seizures and fines. Bingham confiscated parts of the Burkes' property, granting to his brother John the castle of Castlebarry near Castlebar, which had belonged to Edmund Burke, the 80-year-old leader, who had been hanged after conviction for treason in August 1586, having been carried to the gallows on a bier. Perrot wanted an immediate peace, but Bingham insisted on good pledges, suspecting that the rebels were buying time to reap their corn. By 26 August, peace had been made with all the Connacht rebels.

Bingham still had to deal with an incursion by a force of 3,000 Scots who had crossed the River Erne from Ulster. He watched them in the mountains and woods and descended on them at Ardnaree at noon on 23 September, when they thought he was far off. The Scots went into battle formation, but Bingham – despite his paucity of horse – drew them on until his foot came up, then charged and broke them. They fled to the river and all – including women and children – were killed or drowned, except 80. Those who escaped, as well as the Scots horsemen, were killed by locals in Tirawley. Bingham's brother John distinguished himself in this rout.

Meanwhile, Perrot attempted again to invade Bingham's authority, against the advice of his council at Dublin. He brought his forces to Galway to gather evidence on foot of charges brought against Bingham by a rebel supporter, but nobody came in to testify. Perrot left the province in October, and an appeal was made to Francis Walsingham for mediation.

In November, formal complaints were made against Bingham for having provoked the rebellion, but a declaration was signed by 43 Mayo gentlemen to the effect that the cause of the rebellion had been the extinction of the MacWilliam title and the suppression of exactions to be replaced with a central composition. The charges against Bingham, as brought before the Dublin council, were dismissed as malicious in February 1587.

At the end of Bingham's first tour of duty in Connacht, it was claimed that the province was so prosperous that it produced corn for the other provinces and even attracted settlers from the Pale, and that even the composition was being paid in money. By then, the governor had come to tolerate the composition, for all its faults, as an expedient means of governing once the septs had been reduced and brehon law abolished.

== Netherlands and return to Ireland ==
In July 1587 Bingham left Ireland for service in the Netherlands, with the prospect of assuming command of England's expeditionary army at the end of the year upon the recall of the Earl of Leicester. His brother George took his place in Ireland in September. In 1588 Bingham corresponded with Burghley on the defence of the realm against the Spanish. In January of the same year, he married for the first time.

Bingham returned as governor of Connacht later in 1588, reaching Athlone in May. He entered the dispute over the inheritance of the late Donnell O'Connor Sligo, chief of the clan Ó Conchobhair Sligigh, who had died in late 1587, leaving the strategic manor of Sligo to a dubious heir (the castle being reserved to the crown, in order to command the western approach into Ulster). Commissioners appointed by Perrot found for the claimed heir, and Bingham was compelled to deliver custody of the manor, while lodging an objection: on further inquiry, the heir was found to be illegitimate. This finding was confirmed, and the subsequent grant of land was made according to Bingham's recommendation.

== Spanish Armada and renewed rebellion ==
In September 1588, upon news of the flight of the Spanish Armada into the North Sea, Bingham ordered that all Spanish refugees landing on the coast of Connacht should be brought to Galway and put to death there. Many vessels were wrecked in the following month, and of the survivors who came to shore he estimated that 1,000 were put to death under his authority. His brother George, sheriff of County Sligo, also killed many Spanish survivors. Bingham suggested that 50 of the captives be kept alive, but the new Lord Deputy of Ireland, William Fitzwilliam, ordered him to put them all to death; later, more survivors came into his custody and he put them under the charge of bailsmen. (Some years later, in January 1592, Bingham persuaded several Spaniards to come in from the Burkes under protection and sent them to Dublin for passage home, but they were detained in prison there against his wishes.)

In September, Bingham marched out with a small force toward the castles of Doona and Torrane, on intelligence that hundreds of survivors under the command of Don Alonso de Leyva had left those strongholds and marched to Donamona to intercept another landing of 500 men. Punishment was meted out to those suspected of succouring the Spanish. By the end of September, few Irish lords refused to give up their Armada survivors, but the presence of the Spanish caused unrest among several clans. In March 1589 open rebellion was entered by the pretender to the title of the MacWilliam – the Blind Abbot of the Burkes – and by other western clans. Fitzwilliam intervened and laid waste to counties Mayo, Sligo and parts of Roscommon, ordering Bingham to withdraw his forces from Mayo so as not to hinder the pacification.

A peace commission was set up, with Bingham at its head, which sat in Galway in April, but most of the rebels stayed out. Then Sir Brian O'Rourke committed a great cattle raid in County Sligo, while the Burkes took similar action in the southwest, across the Mayo border. The latest rebel demand was for the withdrawal of Bingham from Connacht, the installation of the MacWilliam, and the removal of sheriffs from Mayo. Chaos reigned in the province, while the authorities remained divided on how best to proceed. One faction in the Privy Council of Ireland put the collapse of the talks down to the desire of some of the peace commissioners to blame Bingham for the rebellions.

Bingham pursued his policy in the field, scouring counties Mayo and Roscommon with his forces, until the rebels had caved in and O'Rourke was driven north into Ulster. At Cong he was ordered by Fitzwilliam to cease and to disband some of his newly raised forces, and a new peace commission was appointed to treat until Fitzwilliam arrived. The Lord Deputy was determined that blame be placed on Bingham, and the rebels were resurgent as Fitzwilliam ordered the governor to remain at Athlone. Fitzwilliam travelled to Galway with 350 foot and 120 horse to receive the formal submissions of the rebels, and two books of complaints were lodged by them against Bingham. The complaints were forwarded by the lord deputy into England, and before leaving the province he denied Bingham the use of martial law and cut off his authority to conduct assize sessions, until Fitzwilliam himself had completed his progress through the province.

Connacht remained unstable, and O'Rourke broke into action again, attacking the sheriff of Sligo in the Curlew Mountains. Trouble spread across the north, despite the presence of the lord deputy, and the disablement of the governor became a strategic worry for the government in London. Walsingham wrote in support of Bingham, and the Privy Council at London ordered that a trial before the lord deputy and council at Dublin proceed on the basis of the books of complaint. Fitzwilliam set about gathering evidence against Bingham, but crucial testimony from absent rebels was lacking.

In early October, the Blind Abbott was proclaimed MacWilliam, and the queen ordered Fitzwilliam to assist Bingham in suppressing the title. But support from England could not prevent the charges against Bingham from being read before the council in early November. No witnesses appeared against him (although there were mutterings that they were too fearful to come to Dublin); his own witnesses underwent examination on the 28th. His full acquittal was proclaimed on 5 December.

Bingham returned to Connacht, where the Lord Deputy had gathered his forces at Galway with an invitation to the rebels to submit by 12 January 1590. Hardly any rebels of note accepted, fearing that their hostages would be inadequate and that they themselves would be detained. Bingham was then given a free hand, and promptly marched to Cong with Donogh O'Brien, 4th Earl of Thomond and Ulick Burke, 3rd Earl of Clanricarde. The rebels harried them as they marched into Tirawley, but the next day the Blind Abbott was injured when he chased one of Thomond's kerne – as he overtook his prey on horseback, the kerne wheeled about and struck him with a sword, nearly cutting off the foot above the ankle.

The crown forces progressed through the country, burning crops and villages, and the rebels withdrew with their cattle towards the mountains of Erris, where they soon sued for peace. Bingham was in Roscommon when the Burkes and Clandonnell accepted his conditions, which included the charges of the wars of 1586 and 1589. In 1590 Bingham's forces caused the destruction of Creevelea Abbey in County Leitrim, Moyne Abbey in Killala, County Mayo and Rosserk Friary, near Rosserk, County Mayo. He then turned against O'Rourke who had invaded Sligo in March, although illness prevented him from taking the field and his brother George assumed command. Within the month O'Rourke had fled to Ulster with his sons, and the clans of County Leitrim had submitted.

== End of Perrot's influence ==
In 1592 Perrot, who was then on the Privy Council in London with a special brief to advise on Irish affairs, formally complained to the queen of Bingham's severity and insubordination. But Perrot became entangled in allegations made against him by a priest imprisoned in Dublin, and the investigation broadened out to include the former lord deputy's dealings with the rebel O'Rourke. Bingham's assistance was sought in building a case against Perrot, but curiously his evidence was rather limited. Nevertheless, Perrot was convicted of treason and died in the Tower of London, (Elizabeth I having refused to order his death), while O'Rourke was extradited from Scotland to London, whereupon his rebel followers came into Bingham, who subsequently resisted suggestions that they be attainted. He also made it clear that only O'Rourke's personal seignory be subject to attainder, even though the crown had been expecting a much larger part of the rebel's clan territory in Leitrim.

In June 1592 a Burke faction went into rebellion again, and as part of the ensuing terms of the peace, Bingham forced them to give pledges for each sept, imposed a fine of 2000 marks, and made them bear the damages of war since 1588. Connacht was quiet until May 1593, when Hugh Maguire and the late rebel's son, Brian Óg O'Rourke, raided Sligo after Bingham's brother George had seized the latter's milch cows in lieu of composition rent. In June they suffered heavy losses in a raid on Roscommon in the company of Fiach McHugh O'Byrne, who had brought forces from Leinster. In September Hugh Roe O'Donnell sent a small force to stir up Mayo, and in response, Bingham sent men against Maguire, and the rising proved a failure when the men of Tirawley set upon the rebels.

== Northern rebellions ==
In January 1594, a detachment of Henry Bagenal's army with 2 companies sent by Bingham under the command of his cousin, Captain George Bingham, besieged Enniskillen. The outer wall of the castle defence was breached, and the defenders – 40 shot, 60 able men and 200 others – locked themselves in. Preparations were made to fire the gate, but the defenders sought a parley which was granted and the castle was surrendered: 150 were put to the sword. At this time Bingham was at Athlone and couldn't travel to Dublin because of a disease that prevented him from riding. In August the castle had to be relieved by the lord deputy, and in the following May, it was taken by O'Donnell.

In September 1594, the younger O'Rourke and O'Donnell again attacked Sligo and were driven off with losses. In March the following year, Bingham drove O'Donnell from Roscommon, but he returned in April, and Bingham could only divert him to Longford, while seeking English soldiers to supplement the muster. In June, his cousin George was murdered by his ensign bearer, Ulick Burke (cousin of the Earl of Clanricarde), who had conspired with the garrison in Sligo castle; the castle was then surrendered to O'Donnell. Bingham sought 6 companies and 50 horse from the lord deputy to retake Sligo and Ballyshannon, but few could be spared from the campaign against Hugh O'Neill, Earl of Tyrone, the chief rebel of the period. Bingham stationed his troops and horses in the grounds and buildings of the Dominican friary in Sligo, using the church as a base while he tried to retake the castle. Bingham stripped all the timber from the rood screen and constructed a 'sow' or siege tower to attack the castle. The attack failed and Bingham's forces were routed and chased back to Roscommon castle.

Bingham had been left with few resources to counter the dominance asserted by O'Donnell in northern Connacht; and then the new lord deputy, William Russell, came to Galway to consider a further set of charges against the governor. In the course of an attempted appeasement of the rebels, O'Donnell submitted in April 1596 to John Norreys and Geoffrey Fenton, who had come to Connacht to make peace. The MacWilliam and O'Donnell held out for their own terms: the MacWilliamship and surrender of all queen's lands, and a reduction in the composition rates. The commissioners withdrew their forces in September, and in the following year, a new force under the command of Conyers Clifford was stationed in the north of the province, which compelled the submission of all the Mayo clans during a widespread famine in their country.

Meanwhile, the Privy Council had directed a trial at Dublin of the latest charges against Bingham, who complained about the partiality of Fenton and Norreys. The arrival of a new Lord Deputy, Lord Burgh, in May 1596 seemed to promise a fair hearing, but such were the shifts and feints in the preparatory proceedings that Bingham petitioned the Privy Council for trial before the full Dublin council or in England. In September, fearing assassination, he fled without leave to England to appeal for justice and was put in the Fleet. He sent a petition to Burghley for his release, which was granted in November on account of his illness, although he did suffer a suspension from office.

Bingham was eventually ordered back to Ireland to stand trial before the council, and set out on the journey back in Clifford's company, but had to stop at Chester because of further ill-health. In January 1597, after his ship was blown back to Beaumaris, Bingham excused himself from attending at Dublin – again due to ill-health, which continued into the summer when he also complained of the expense of maintaining relatives at Dublin.

In 1598, when it became clear that the Tyrone's rebellion was getting out of control, Bingham's knowledge of Irish affairs was suddenly deemed unequalled in England. Upon Sir Robert Cecil's suggestion that the Earl of Essex take command in Ireland, Francis Bacon urged Essex to heed the advice of the veteran governor of Connacht. After the significant defeat of the crown forces at the battle of the Yellow Ford, a faction fight grew at court between the Cecil and Essex parties over the Irish appointment – fuelled by the anticipation of a significant Spanish intervention, either in England or Ireland. The circumstances had grown desperate, and Bingham received an appointment as marshal of Ireland and general of Leinster. He left England at the head of 5,000 troops but, upon arrival at Dublin, he died.

== Legacy ==
Bingham married Sarah Heigham (1565–1634) of Suffolk in January 1588, but left no male issue. His nephew, Sir Henry Bingham, 1st Baronet – son of George – succeeded to his estate. A cenotaph was erected in his name in Westminster Abbey. He had one daughter, Martha. His widow remarried Edward Waldegrave.

Bingham's reputation has suffered from the harshness of his rule in Connacht, and he became the image of a cruel governor, lording it over the Irish without regard to justice or mercy.

== Bibliography ==
- Bagwell, Richard (1890). Ireland under the Tudors. Vol. 3 vols. London.
- O'Donovan, John (1851). Annals of Ireland by the Four Masters. Vol. 7 vols.
- Ellis, Steven G. (1985). Tudor Ireland. London. ISBN 0-582-49341-2.
- Morgan, Hiram (1993). Tyrone's Rebellion: The Outbreak of the Nine Years War in Ireland. Woodbridge.
- Falls, Cyril (1996) [1950]. Elizabeth's Irish Wars. reprint London. ISBN 0-09-477220-7.
- Dictionary of National Biography 60 vols. (London, 2004)
