= Richard Lestrange =

16th-century English politician

Richard Lestrange (L'Estrange, Strange) (born before 1526) of Hunstanton and King's Lynn, Norfolk; later of Kilkenny, Ireland, was an English politician.

== Family ==
Lestrange was the second son of Thomas le Strange and Anne Vaux, daughter of Nicholas Vaux, 1st Baron Vaux of Harrowden. His brother, Nicholas Lestrange, was also an MP, who represented Castle Rising, Norfolk and King's Lynn. He was related to William FitzWilliam, but their exact connection is unrecorded.

Lestrange married Dorothy Astley and they had one son, Thomas.

Lestrange's descendants settled at Castle Strange, County Roscommon.

== Career ==
Lestrange was a Member of Parliament (MP) of the Parliament of England for Horsham in 1559 and for King's Lynn in 1563. He was an early supporter of the rights of Queen Mary I.

Lestrange probably secured election through his brother Nicholas, who was Chamberlain to Thomas Howard, Duke of Norfolk; both Horsham and King's Lynn were controlled by the Duke.
