= Nicholas L'Estrange (politician, born 1511) =

16th-century English politician

Sir Nicholas le Strange (1 January 1511 – 19 February 1580) of Hunstanton, Norfolk, was an English member of parliament (MP) who held significant lands and offices in Norfolk.

== Biography ==
The eldest son of Thomas Le Strange and Anne Vaux, L'Estrange was born in 1515. He succeeded his father in 1545 and was knighted in 1547. His mother was Anne, a daughter of Nicholas Vaux, 1st Baron Vaux of Harrowden. He had a brother, Richard Lestrange, who was also a Norfolk Member of Parliament (MP).

L'Estrange was appointed a justice of the peace for Norfolk for 1538–1547, 1558/59–1571 and from 1579 for life, and High Sheriff of Norfolk and Suffolk for 1548–1549. He was appointed as steward of the manors of Mary FitzRoy, Duchess of Richmond and Somerset in 1546, and also Chamberlain to Thomas Howard, the Duke of Norfolk. On 15 September 1549 he wrote to William Cecil, the king's attorney, denying any sympathy with Kett's rebellion. In March 1552, during the reign of Edward VI, L'Estrange succeeded Walter Buckler as chamberlain to Princess Elizabeth's household at Hatfield, Hertfordshire.

L'Estrange was elected MP for the County of Norfolk in the Parliament of 1547. With the support of the Duke of Norfolk, he was MP for King's Lynn in 1555 and Castle Rising in 1558, 1559, 1563 and 1571. He was not elected to Parliament again after Norfolk's fall in 1572. In May 1571, he conveyed his estates to his eldest son, Hamon.

L'Estrange married twice: first, in 1528, to Eleanor, daughter of William Fitzwilliam of Milton, Northamptonshire, with whom he had three sons and two daughters and, secondly, in 1546, Katherine, the daughter of John Hyde of Hyde, Dorset and widow of Nicholas Mynn of Great Fransham, Norfolk. He was buried on 19 February 1580 at the parish church in Hunstanton, Norfolk.
