= Tudor conquest of Ireland =

1534–1603 English campaign in Ireland

- Part of the European wars of religion and the English Reformation
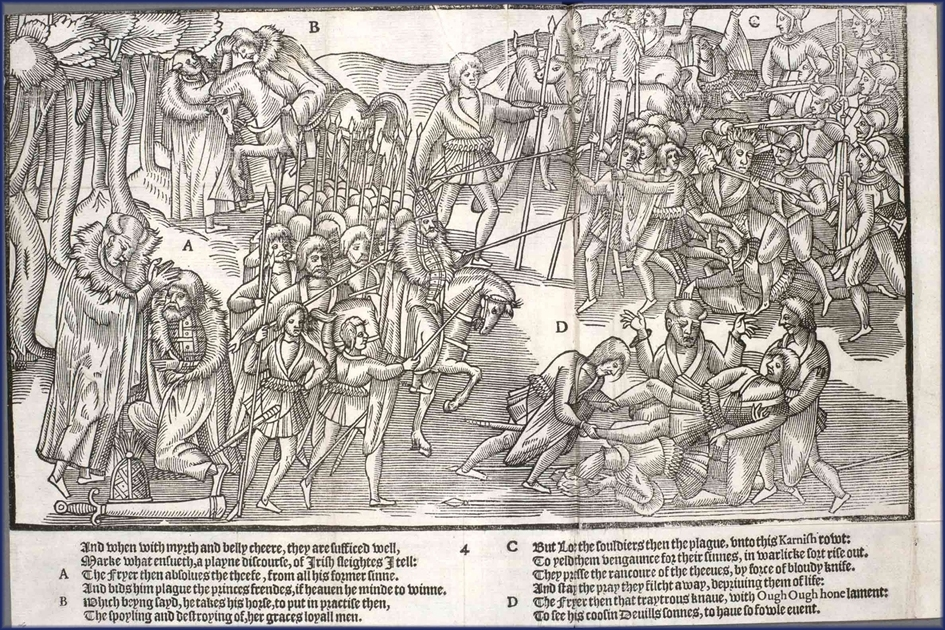
- Irish chieftain (left) receives a priest's blessing before departing to fight the English (right), who are shown in full armour and armed with muskets.
Date	11 June 1534–30 March 1603 (Note: June 11 1534 marks the date when Thomas FitzGerald, 10th Earl of Kildare publicly renounced his allegiance to his cousin King Henry VIII, Lord of Ireland. 30 March 1603 marks the repeal of the Treaty of Mellifont, signaling the end of hostilities between English and Irish forces.)
Location	Ireland
Result	English victory: Gaelic Ireland annexed by the Tudors; Plantations of Ireland; Hegemony of the New English; Catholic Church in Ireland outlawed; Treaty of Mellifont

Belligerents
England: Kingdom of Ireland	Gaelic Ireland; Spain

Commanders and leaders
Henry Sidney; Thomas Radclyffe; Leonard Grey; Richard Bingham; William Drury; Arthur Grey; William Pelham; William FitzWilliam; John Perrot; John Norreys; Walter Raleigh; Humphrey Gilbert; George Carew; Arthur Chichester; Henry Docwra; Charles Blount; Walter Deveraux; Henry Bagenal	Irish leaders: Hugh O'Neill; Hugh Roe O'Donnell; Hugh Maguire; Brian Oge O'Rourke; Rory Oge O'More; Shane O'Neill; Fiach MacHugh O'Byrne; Florence MacCarthy; Donal Cam O'Sullivan Beare; Donnell O'Brien; Sorley Boy MacDonnell; Brian Oge O'Rourke; Grace O'Malley; Donald MacCarthy Mor; James FitzMaurice FitzGerald; Silken Thomas FitzGerald; Gerald FitzGerald; Edmund Butler; Richard Tyrrell; James FitzThomas FitzGerald; Spanish leaders: Juan del Águila

Ireland was conquered by the Tudor monarchs of England in the 16th century. The Anglo-Normans had conquered swathes of Ireland in the late 12th century, bringing it under Anglo-Norman rule. In the 14th century, the effective area of English rule shrank markedly, and from then most of Ireland was held by native Gaelic chiefdoms. Following a failed rebellion by the Earl of Kildare in the 1530s, the English Crown set about restoring its authority. Henry VIII of England was made "King of Ireland" by the Crown of Ireland Act 1542. The conquest involved assimilating the Gaelic nobility by way of "surrender and regrant"; the confiscation and colonisation ('plantation') of lands with settlers from Britain; imposing English law and language; banning Catholicism, dissolving the monasteries, and making Anglican Protestantism the state religion.

The Tudor policies in Ireland sparked the Desmond Rebellions (1569–1573, 1579–1583) and the Nine Years' War (1593–1603). Despite Spain sending an armada to support the Irish Catholics during the Anglo-Spanish War (1585–1604), by 1603 the entire country was under English rule. The Flight of the Earls in 1607 largely completed the destruction of the Gaelic aristocracy and left the way open for the Plantation of Ulster, which established a large British Protestant population in the north. Several people who helped establish the plantations of Ireland also played a part later in the early colonisation of North America, particularly a group known as the West Country Men.

The conquest technically extended into the Stuart period, as the Treaty of Mellifont, which ended the Nine Years' War, was signed mere days after the death of Elizabeth I.

== Situation before the Tudors ==
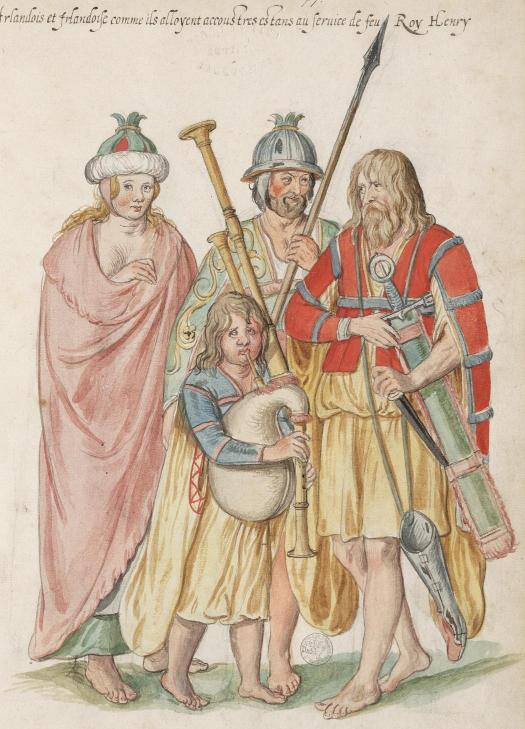
Irish Gaels in a painting from the 16th century

Ireland in 1500 was shaped by the Norman conquest, initiated by Cambro-Norman barons in the 12th century. Many of the native Gaelic Irish had been expelled from various parts of the country (mainly the east and southeast) and replaced with English peasants and labourers. A large area on the east coast, extending from the Wicklow Mountains in the south to Dundalk in the north (covering parts of modern counties of Dublin, Louth, Meath, Westmeath, Kildare, Offaly, and Laois), became known as the Pale. Protected along much of its length by a ditch and rampart, the Pale was a defended area in which English language and culture predominated and where English law was enforced by a government in Dublin.

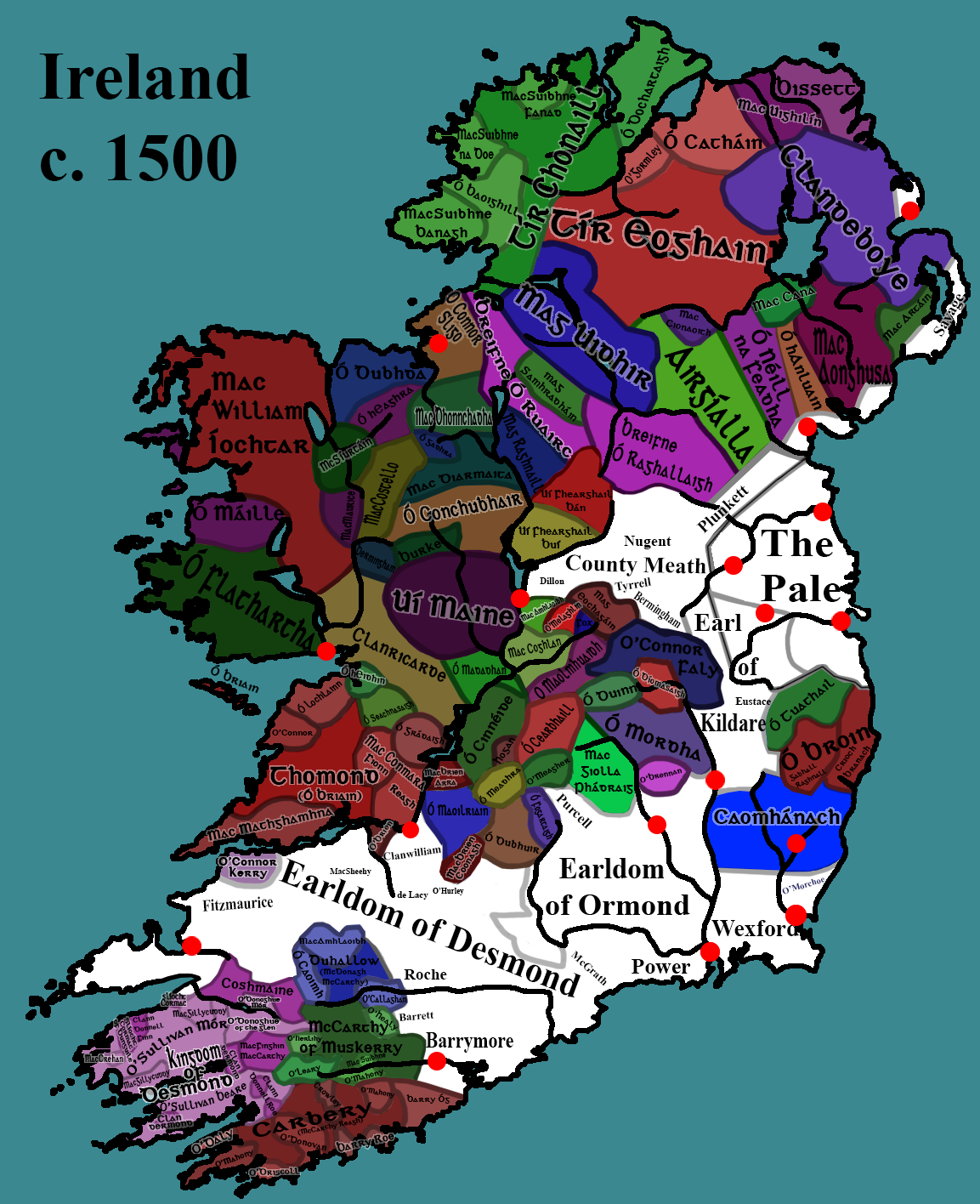
Ireland at the beginning of the Tudor period.

The Gaelic Irish were largely outside English jurisdiction, maintaining their own language, social system, customs, and laws. The English referred to them as "His Majesty's Irish enemies". In legal terms, they had never been admitted as subjects of the Crown. Ireland was not formally a realm, but rather a lordship held as a fief of the Holy See; the title 'Lord of Ireland' was assumed by the English monarch upon coronation. The rise of Gaelic influence resulted in the passing in 1366 of the Statutes of Kilkenny, which outlawed many social practices that had been developing apace (e.g. intermarriage, use of the Irish language and Irish dress). In the 15th century, the Dublin government remained weak, owing principally to the Wars of the Roses.

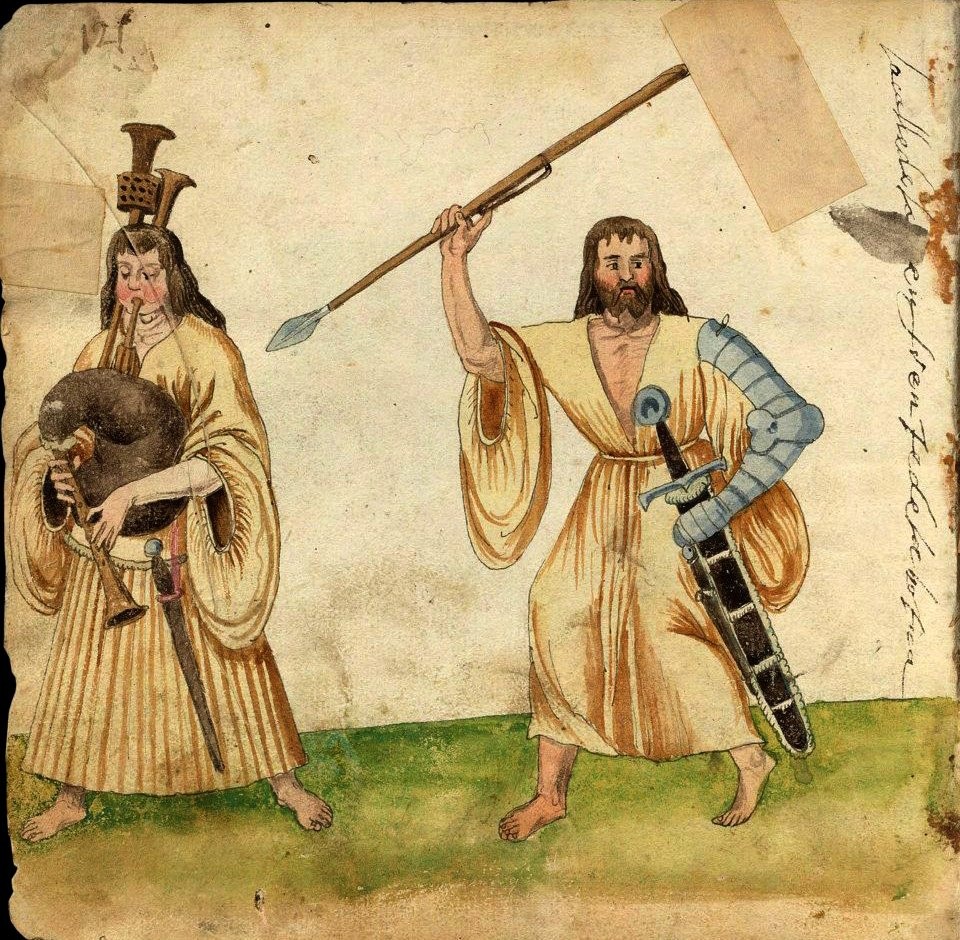
Irish Gaels, c. 1529

Beyond the Pale, the authority of the Dublin government was tenuous. The Hiberno-Norman lords had been able to carve out fiefdoms for themselves but not to settle them with English tenants. As a result, in the 14th and 15th centuries, in the wake of Irish rebellion, Scottish invasion, the Black Death, and a lack of interest on the part of the London government, the territories controlled by those lords had become autonomous. The Butlers, FitzGeralds, and Burkes raised their own armed forces, enforced their own law, and adopted Gaelic language and culture.

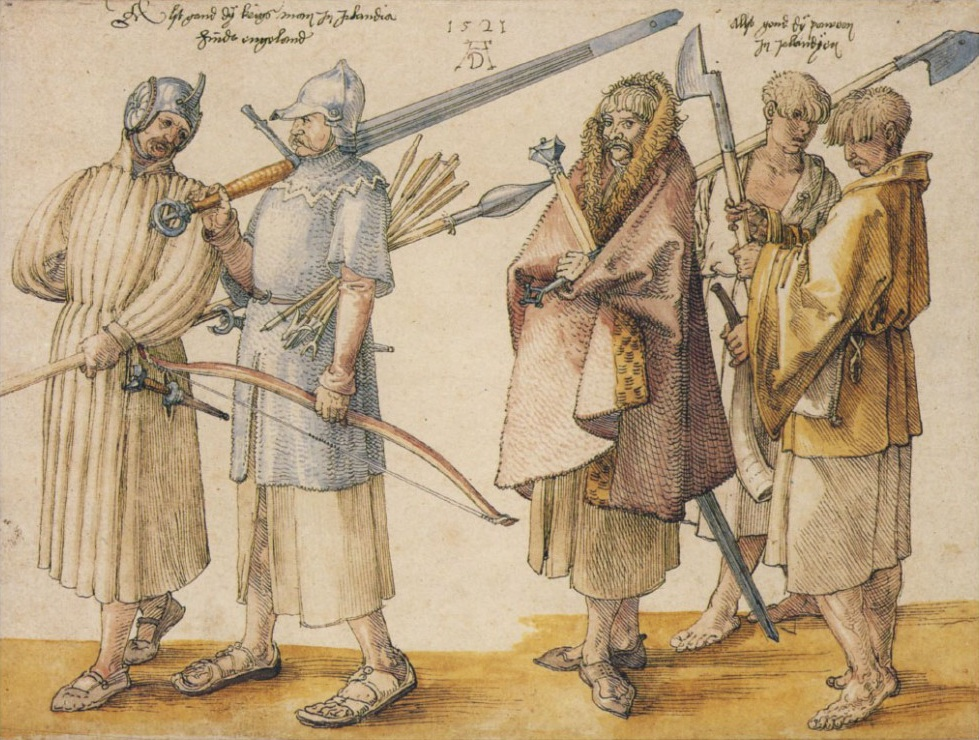
16th century Irish warriors, Gallowglass (left) and Kern (right). Drawing by Albrecht Dürer, 1521.

Beyond those territories large areas of land previously held by authority of the English crown were taken by the resurgent Gaelic Irish, particularly in the north and midlands. Among the most important septs were the O'Neills (Uí Néill) in central Ulster (Tír Eóghain), flanked to their west by the O'Donnells (Uí Dhomnaill); the O'Byrnes (Uí Bhroin) and O'Tooles (Uí Thuathail) in County Wicklow; the Kavanaghs (Uí Chaomhánach) in County Wexford; the MacCarthys ((Uí) Mhic Chárthaigh) and O'Sullivans (Uí Shúilleabháin) in County Cork and County Kerry; and the O'Brien (Uí Bhriain) lordship of Thomond in County Clare.

== Henry VIII ==
By 1500, English monarchs had delegated government of Ireland to the most powerful of the Hiberno-Norman dynasties – the FitzGeralds of Kildare – to keep the costs of running Ireland down and to protect the Pale. The King's Lord Deputy of Ireland was chief of the administration, based in Dublin Castle, but maintained no formal court and had a limited privy purse. In 1495, laws were passed during Poynings's Parliament that imposed English statutory law wholesale upon the lordship and compromised the independence of the Parliament of Ireland.

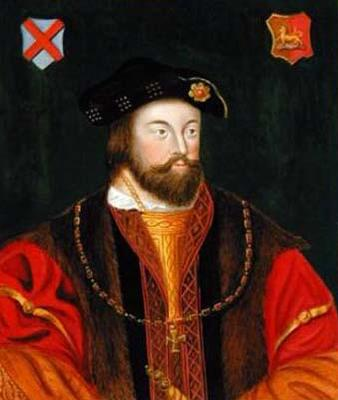
Silken Thomas; his family the FitzGeralds had strong Yorkist leanings and he led a rising in Kildare against the Tudor monarchy of Henry VIII.

The head of the Kildare FitzGeralds held the position of lord deputy until 1534. The problem was that the House of Kildare had become unreliable for the English monarch, scheming with Yorkist pretenders to the English throne, signing private treaties with foreign powers, and finally rebelling after the head of its hereditary rivals, the Butlers of Ormonde, was awarded the position of lord deputy. The Reformation also led to growing tension between England and Ireland as Protestantism gained sway within England. Thomas, Earl of Kildare, a Catholic, offered control of Ireland to both the pope and Emperor Charles V of the Holy Roman Empire. Henry put down the rebellion by executing the leader ("Silken Thomas" FitzGerald), along with several of his uncles, and imprisoned Gearóid Óg, the head of the family. But now the king had to find a replacement for the FitzGeralds to keep Ireland quiet. What was needed was a cost-effective new policy that protected the Pale and guaranteed the safety of England's vulnerable west flank from foreign invasion.

With the assistance of Thomas Cromwell, the King implemented the policy of surrender and regrant. This extended royal protection to all of Ireland's elite without regard to ethnicity; in return the whole country was expected to obey the law of the central government; and all Irish lords were to officially surrender their lands to the Crown, and to receive them back in return by royal charter. The keystone to the reform was in a statute passed by the Irish Parliament in 1542, whereby the lordship was converted to the Kingdom of Ireland. Overall, the intention was to assimilate the Gaelic and Gaelicised upper classes and to develop a loyalty on their part to the new crown. To this end, they were granted English titles and for the first time admitted to the Irish Parliament. One of the more important was the earldom of Tyrone, which was created for the Uí Néill dynasty in 1542. In a felicitous phrase, the king summed up his efforts at reform as "politic drifts and amiable persuasions".

In practice, lords around Ireland accepted their new privileges but carried on as they had before. For the Irish Lordships, the English monarch was but another overlord similar to that found in the Gaelic system. It was, however, the Tudors' increasing encroachment upon the Irish local autonomy by the development of a centralised state that was to bring the English system into direct conflict with the Gaelic one. Henry's religious Reformation – although not as thorough as in England – caused disquiet; his lord deputy, Anthony St Leger, was largely able to buy off opposition by granting lands confiscated from the monasteries to Irish nobles.

== Difficulties ==
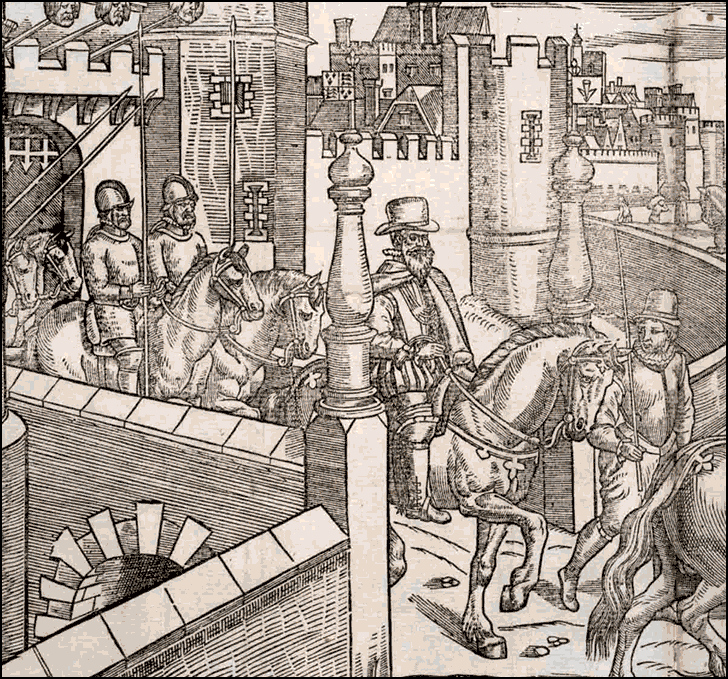
Henry Sidney, Lord Deputy of Ireland under Elizabeth I, sets out from Dublin Castle. Detail from a plate in The Image of Irelande, by John Derrick (London, 1581).

After the king's death, successive lords deputy of Ireland found that actually establishing the rule of the central government was far more difficult than merely securing the Irish lords' pledges of allegiance. Successive rebellions broke out, the first in Leinster in the 1550s, when the O'Moore and O'Connor clans were displaced to make way for the Plantation of Queen's County and King's County (named for Mary I of England and Philip II of Spain; modern counties Laois and Offaly). In the 1560s, English attempts to interfere in a succession dispute within the O'Neill sept, or clan, sparked a long war between Thomas Radcliffe (Lord Deputy of Sussex) and Seán Mac Cuinn Ó Néill. Irish lordships continued to fight private wars against each other, ignoring the government in Dublin and its laws. Two examples of this were the Battle of Affane in 1565, fought between the Ormonde and Desmond dynasties, and the Battle of Farsetmore in 1567, fought between the O'Donnells and O'Neills. Elsewhere, clans such as the O'Byrnes and O'Tooles continued raiding the Pale as they had always done. The most serious violence of all occurred in Munster in the 1560s to 1580s, when the Fitzgeralds of Desmond launched the Desmond Rebellions to prevent direct English influence into their territory. After a particularly brutal campaign in which up to a third of the population of the province was reported to have died, the rebellion was finally ended when the Earl of Desmond was killed in 1583.

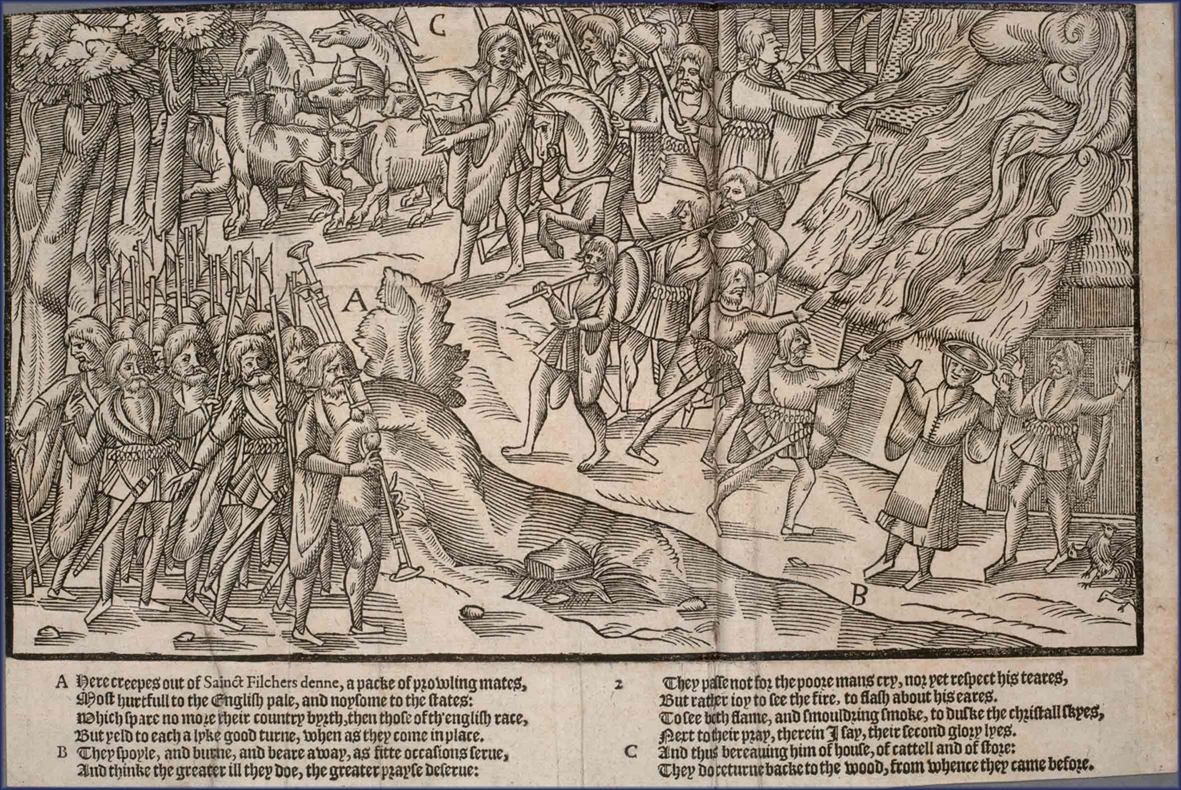
Irish Kern, carrying halberds and pikes depicted launching a Cattle raid, by John Derrick (1581)

There were two main reasons for the chronic violence that dogged the central government in Ireland. The first was some of the aggressive acts of the English administrators and soldiers. In many instances, garrisons or "seneschals" disregarded the law and killed local chiefs and lords, and sometimes seized native-owned land. The second cause of violence was the incompatibility of Gaelic Irish society with English law and central government. In Irish law, the chief of a sept or clan was elected from a small noble lineage group called a derbfine. This often caused violence between rival candidates. However, under Henry VIII's settlement, succession was, as was the English custom, by inheritance of the first-born son, or primogeniture, which was intended to result in fewer disputes over inheritance but also in an increasing reduction in the distribution of landed wealth. Imposing this law forced the English to take sides in violent disputes within Irish lordships. Finally, important sections of Irish society had a vested interest in opposing the English presence. These included the mercenary class or gallowglass, and Irish poets or file – both of whom faced having their source of income and status abolished in an English-ruled Ireland.

== Solutions ==
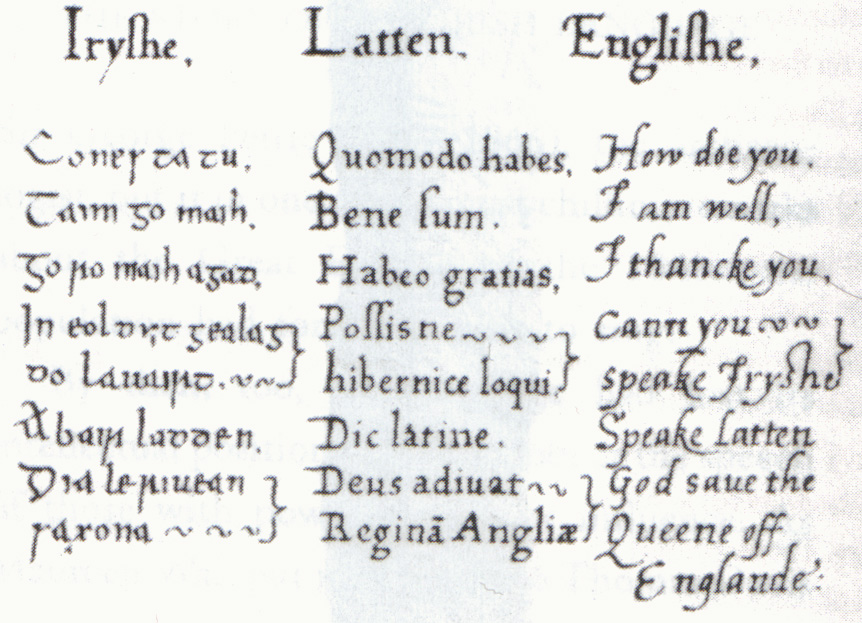
Multilingual phrase book compiled by Sir Christopher Nugent for Elizabeth I of England.

Under Mary I and Elizabeth I, the English in Ireland tried a number of solutions to pacify the country. The first such initiative used martial government, whereby violent areas such as the Wicklow Mountains were garrisoned by small numbers of English troops under commanders called seneschalls. The seneschal was given powers of martial law, which allowed execution without trial by jury. Every person within the seneschal's area of authority had to be vouched for by the local lord—"masterless men" were liable to be killed. In this way, it was hoped that the Irish lords would prevent raiding by their own followers. However, in practice, this simply antagonised the native chieftains.

The failure of this policy prompted the English to come up with more long-term solutions to pacify and Anglicise Ireland. One was composition, where private armed forces were abolished, and provinces were occupied by English troops under the command of governors, titled lords president. In return, the pre-eminent septs and lords were exempted from taxation and had their entitlements to rents from subordinate families and their tenants put on a statutory basis. The imposition of this settlement was marked by bitter violence, particularly in Connacht, where the MacWilliam Burkes fought a local war against the English Provincial President, Sir Richard Bingham, and his subordinate, Nicholas Malby. In Munster the interference of the lord president was one of the major causes of the Desmond Rebellions. However, this method was successful in some areas, notably in Thomond, where it was supported by the ruling O'Brien dynasty. Composition merged into the policy of surrender and regrant.

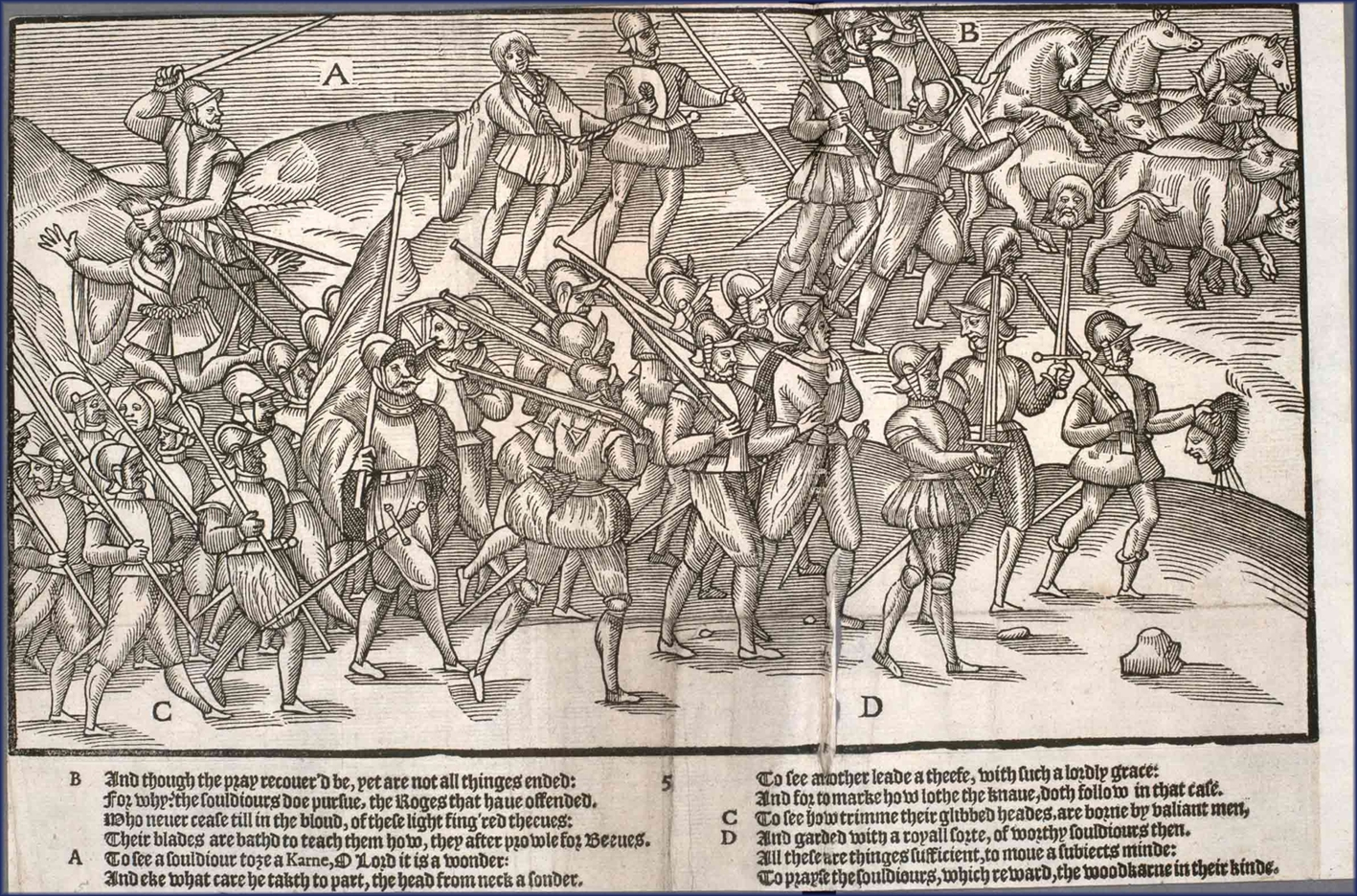
English soldiers return from a raid with cattle, severed Irish heads, and Irish captives, from The Image of Irelande, 1581

The second long-term solution was Plantations, in which areas of the country were to be settled with people from England, who would bring in English language and culture while remaining loyal to the crown. Plantation had been started in the 1550s in Laois and Offaly, the former being shired by Queen Mary as "Queen's County", and again in the 1570s in Antrim, both times with limited success. In the 1590s, after the Desmond Rebellions, parts of Munster were populated with English in the plantation of that province, but the project was half-hearted and ran into legal difficulties when Irish landowners chose to sue; the largest grant of lands was made to Sir Walter Raleigh, but he never really made a success of it and sold out to Sir Richard Boyle, who later became Earl of Cork and the wealthiest subject of the early Stuart monarchs.

After a neutral period from 1558 to 1570, Pope Pius V declared Elizabeth a heretic in his 1570 papal bull Regnans in Excelsis. This complicated the conquest further, as her authority to rule was denied and her officials were considered by observant Roman Catholics to be acting unlawfully. Most Irish people of all ranks remained Catholic and the bull gave Protestant administrators a new reason to expedite the conquest. The Second Desmond Rebellion, from 1579 to 1583, was assisted by hundreds of papal troops. Religion had become a new marker of loyalty to the administration.

The prospect of land confiscation further alienated the Irish. But the alienation wasn't confined to the Gaelic Irish: those who claimed descent from the original Anglo-Norman conquerors under Henry II were increasingly referred to as the "Old English", to distinguish them from the many administrators, captains, and planters (the New English) who were arriving in Ireland. And it was mostly amongst this Old English community that fervent commitment to Catholicism was gaining ground.

== Crisis ==
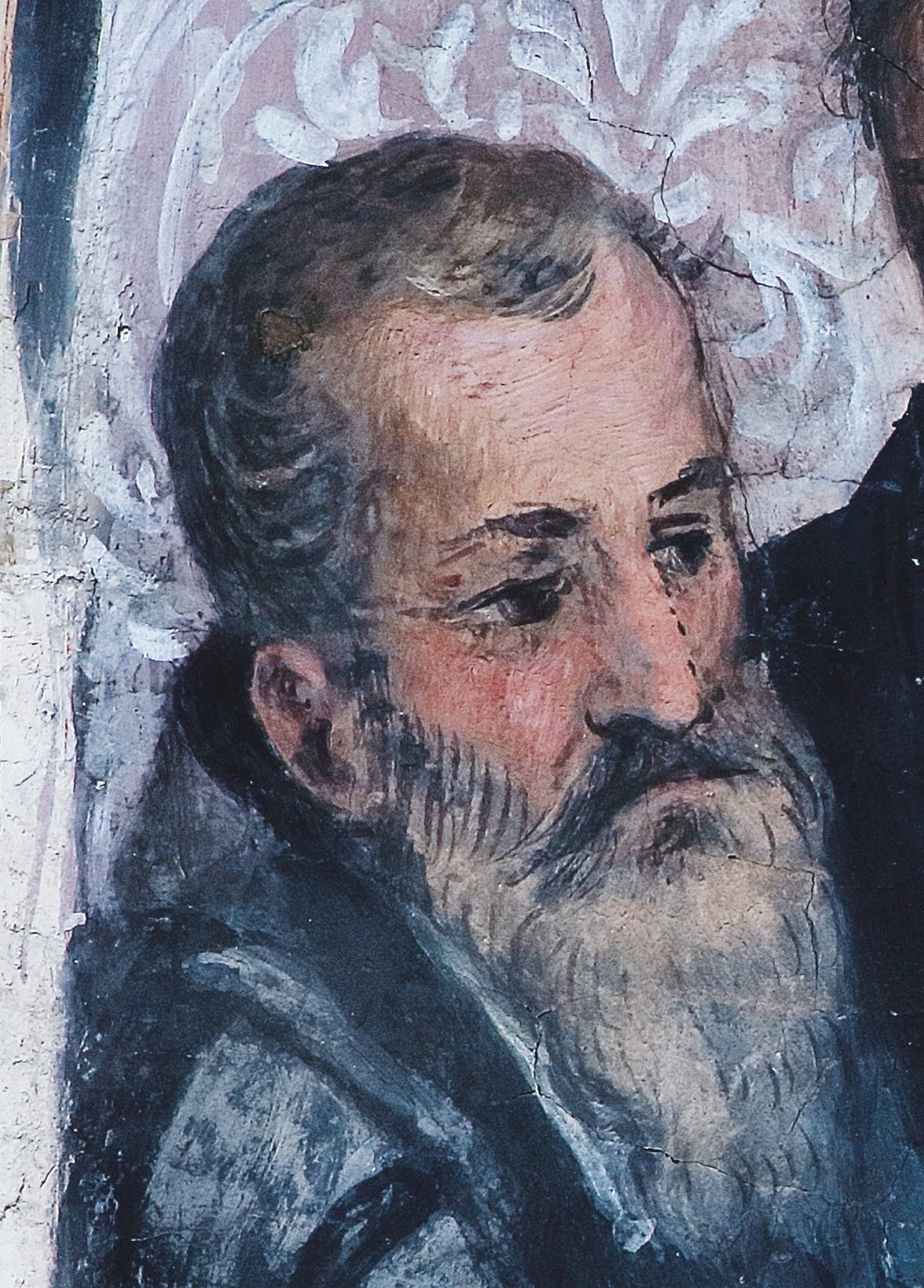
Hugh O'Neill, Earl of Tyrone

The crisis point of the Elizabethan conquest of Ireland came when the English authorities tried to extend their authority over Ulster and Hugh O'Neill (Irish: Aodh Mór Ó Néill), the most powerful Irish lord in Ireland. Though initially appearing to support the crown, O'Neill engaged in a proxy war in Fermanagh and northern Connacht, by sending troops to aid Hugh Maguire (Irish: Aodh Mag Uidhir), Lord of Fermanagh. This distracted the crown with military campaigns in the west while O'Neill consolidated his power in Ulster. O'Neill openly broke with the crown in February 1595 when his forces took and destroyed the Blackwater Fort on the Armagh-Tyrone border. In what was later named the Nine Years' War, O'Neill focused his action in Ulster and along its borders, until Spanish promises of aid in 1596 led him to spread the conflict to the rest of Ireland. What had started as a war for regional autonomy became a war for the control of Ireland. With the Irish victory at the Battle of the Yellow Ford, the collapse of the Munster Plantation, followed by the dismal vice-royalty of Robert Devereux, 2nd Earl of Essex, the power of the Crown in Ireland came close to collapse.

In wider European terms, it was a part of the Anglo-Spanish War (1585–1604). While O'Neill enlisted the help of lords throughout Ireland, his most significant support came from the Spanish king. Philip III of Spain sent an invasion force, only to see it surrender after a winter siege at the Battle of Kinsale in 1601. Outside Kinsale, O'Neill's own army was defeated. The war ended in early 1603; thereafter the authority of the Crown was gradually reestablished throughout country. O'Neill and his allies were treated relatively generously, considering the cost of the rebellion, and were regranted their titles and most of their lands. Unable to live with more restrictive conditions, they left Ireland in 1607 in the Flight of the Earls. As a result, their lands in Ulster were confiscated. In the ensuing Plantation of Ulster, great numbers of people from all over Britain were encouraged to move to Ulster.

As plantation policy expanded to outlying districts including Sligo, Fermanagh and Monaghan, the English occupation of Ireland grew increasingly militaristic. The Counter-Reformation created an environment of anti-Protestantism within the native population which hindered English influence and led to a massive uprising ending in 1603. It became increasingly clear that the only profitable gain from its recent subjugation of Ireland was the land it yielded. Tens of thousands of Protestants, mainly Scots, emigrated to Antrim and Ulster, supplanting the Irish residents.

In 1601, in an effort to fund wartime expenses in Ireland and deprive Irish rebels of foreign exchange, Elizabeth I proclaimed a debasement of the Irish currency. The proclamation authorized the new, debased coin as legal tender.

== Results ==
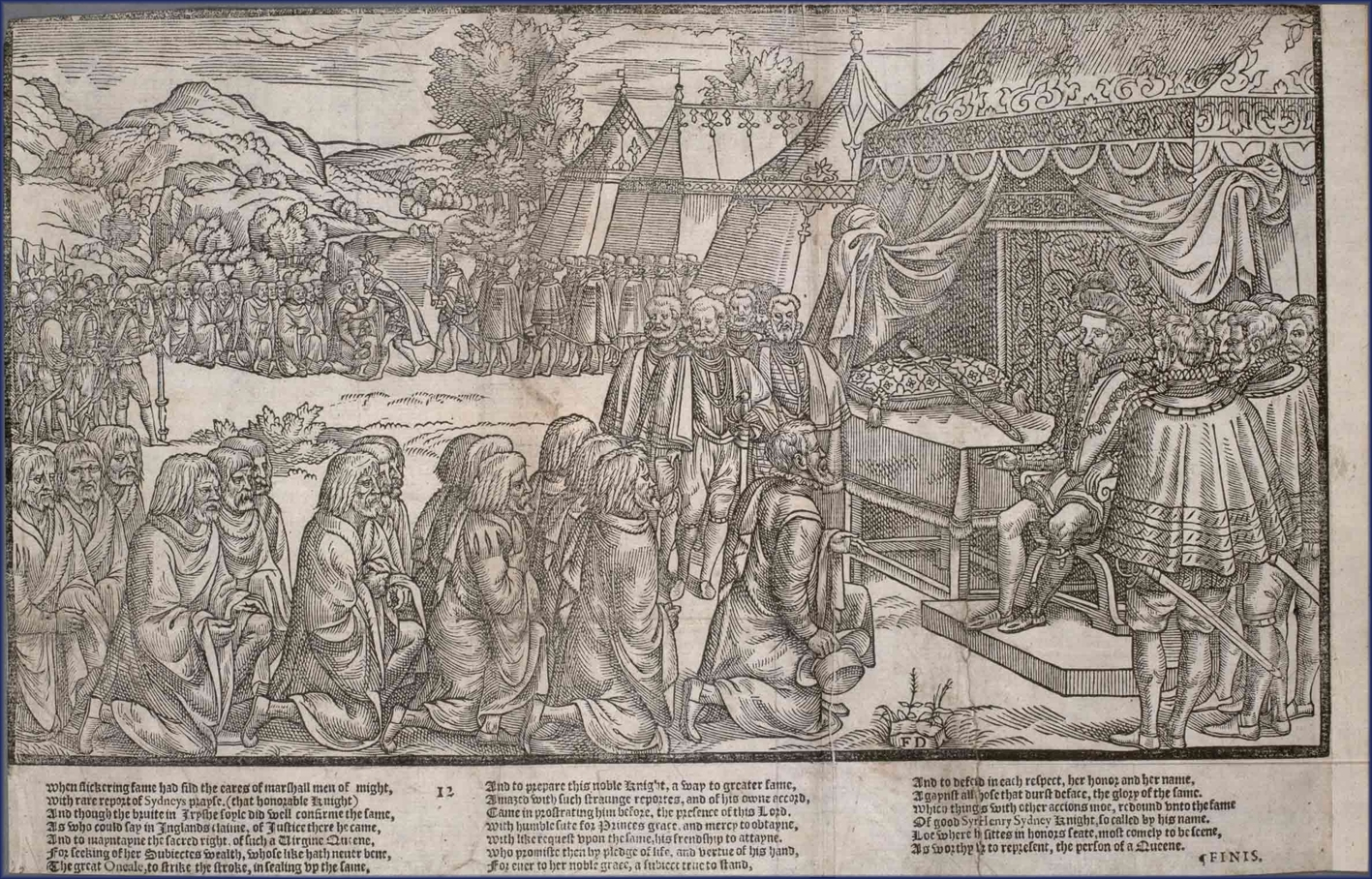
The Irish Gaelic chieftain O'Neale and the other kerns kneel before Henry Sidney, from The Image of Irelande, 1581

The first and most important result of the conquest was the disarmament of the native Irish lordships and the establishment of central government control for the first time over the whole island; Irish culture, law, and language were replaced; and many Irish lords lost their lands and hereditary authority. Thousands of English, Scottish, and Welsh settlers were introduced into the country and the administration of justice was enforced according to English common law and statutes of the Parliament of Ireland.

As the 16th century progressed, the religious question grew in significance. Rebels such as James Fitzmaurice Fitzgerald and Aodh Mór Ó Néill sought and received help from Catholic powers in Europe, justifying their actions on religious grounds. However, the Pale community and many Irish lords did not consider them to be genuinely religiously motivated. In the new century, the country would become polarised between Catholics and Protestants, especially after the planting of a large English population into Ireland and Scots Presbyterians in Ulster (See Plantation of Ulster).

Under James I, Catholics were barred from all public office after the Gunpowder Plot was discovered in 1605; the Gaelic Irish and Old English increasingly defined themselves as Catholic in opposition to the Protestant New English. However the native Irish (both Gaelic and Old English) remained the majority landowners in the country until after the Irish Rebellion of 1641. By the end of the resulting Cromwellian conquest of Ireland in the 1650s, the "New English" Protestants dominated the country, and after the Glorious Revolution of 1688 their descendants went on to form the Protestant Ascendancy.

The 1601 debasement of the Irish currency led to multiple lawsuits, most notably Gilbert v. Brett, commonly known as the Case of Mixt Monies, which was referred to the Privy Council of England in 1604. The Case "confirmed the principle of monetary nominalism in the common law."

== See also ==
- History of Ireland (1536–1691)
- Plantations of Ireland
- History of Ireland
- Desmond Rebellions
- Nine Years' War
- Miler Magrath
