= Thomas Le Strange (courtier) =

English courtier

Sir Thomas Le Strange
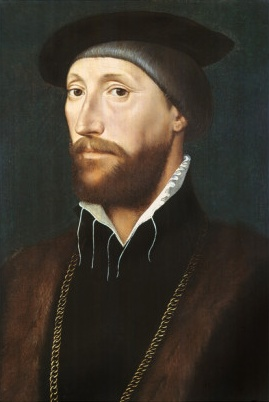
- Portrait of Sir Thomas Le Strange, 1536, Hans Holbein the Younger
- Born: c. 1490
- Died: 16 January 1545 (aged 54–55); Hunstanton Hall
- Resting place: St Mary's Church, Hunstanton; 52°56′55″N 0°30′45″E
- Other name: Thomas Lestrange
- Occupations: Courtier; Administrator
- Spouse: Anne Vaux (m. 1501)
- Children: Sir Nicholas Le Strange; Richard Le Strange; William Le Strange; Roger Le Strange; Henry Le Strange; Thomas Le Strange; William Le Strange; Edmund Le Strange; Elizabeth Le Strange; Alice Le Strange; Anne Le Strange; Katherine Le Strange; Mary Le Strange
- Parents: Robert Le Strange; Anne Le Strange
- Family: Le Strange

Sir Thomas Le Strange or Lestrange (c. 1490 – 16 January 1545) of Hunstanton, was a Norfolk landowner and courtier in the time of King Henry VIII.

== Family background ==
The Le Strange family had held the lordship of Hunstanton since the early 12th century. In the 13th century, when the main line of the family became established as barons of Knockin on the Welsh Marches, John le Strange, 1st Baron Strange of Knockyn enfeoffed one of his younger sons named Hamo with the old family lordship in Norfolk.

Thomas was born about 1490, and was the son and heir of Robert le Strange, a descendant of Hamo. Robert was a younger brother who became heir to the main Hunstanton lordship as an adult, when his nephew John died in March 1514 without surviving children. Robert's wife Anne le Strange, the mother of Thomas, was a co-heiress of another old branch of the le Strange family, who had been lords of Walton d'Eiville in Warwickshire.

After Robert died, his widow Anne married Edward Knyvett, the son William Knyvett.

== Career ==
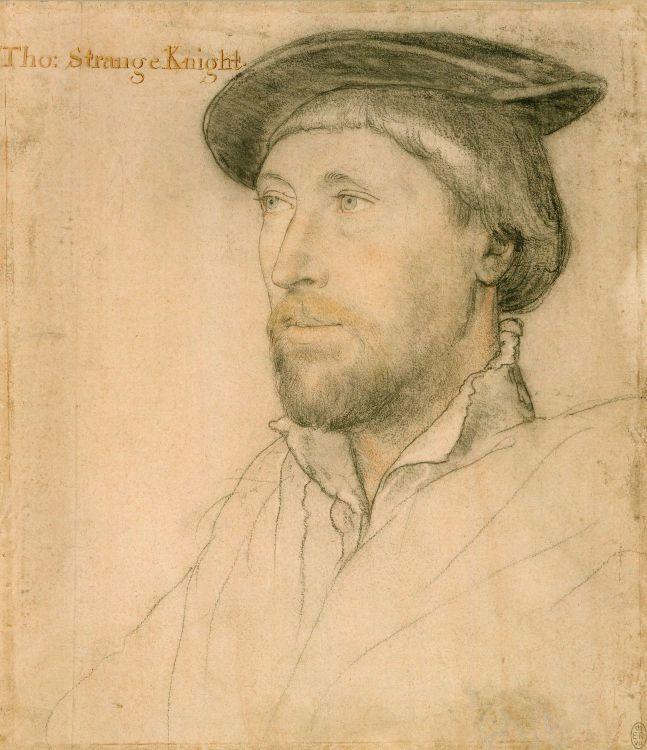
Thomas Le Strange, Portrait Sketch at Windsor, by Hans Holbein the Younger

As a young man, Le Strange was closely connected to the king's inner circle. He attended the king as an esquire of the body when he went to negotiate with the king of France at the Field of the Cloth of Gold in 1520.

It was apparently in the period 1526–1528 that a chalk drawing of Le Strange was made by Holbein. This sketch appears to have been used to paint a portrait of Le Strange as an older man, which once hung at Hunstanton Hall.

Le Strange accompanied the king to Calais in 1529, and was knighted at Whitehall in the same year. He served as Sheriff of Norfolk and Suffolk in 1530. However, this was not seen as a desirable office to hold, and in August 1531 Le Strange requested and received an exemption from being forced to serve on juries, as sheriff, escheator, bailiff, or constable. In October 1532, he went with the king to Calais to meet with the King of France.

Le Strange was in attendance on Anne Boleyn at her coronation in 1533. In 1536 he also attended her execution.

In 1536/1537, during the Pilgrimage of Grace rebellion against the Dissolution of the Monasteries, Le Strange served under the Duke of Norfolk, attending the king and queen, and Le Strange accompanied the duke's son as guardian of the royal treasure. During 1536, Le Strange took 50 of his men together with the duke, to confront a part of the rebellion in Lincolnshire. In 1537, he also attended the executions of conspirators in Norwich, Walsingham and King's Lynn.

Le Strange was in communication with Thomas Cromwell, who visited him in Hunstanton in 1536, and served as a royal commissioner under him. Le Strange was therefore directly involved with the dissolution of monasteries in his region, including Coxford (1534), Westacre (1538), Great Massingham (1538), and Walsingham (1538). He was able to benefit from the dissolution by obtaining grants of monastic lands.

Le Strange served as a Norfolk justice of the peace (JP), and in the Norfolk commissions of sewers, which managed waterways in marshy areas. He was dismissed as a JP in 1538 for one year, but the reasons for this are unknown.

From the 1530s, Le Strange spent most of his time in Norfolk, where his household accounts show that his wealth was increasing. Income from his sheep farming was supplemented by income from newly purchased lands where cattle were raised in central Norfolk.

In 1539, Le Strange was chosen to be an attendant of Thomas Howard, 3rd Duke of Norfolk at the reception of Anne of Cleves.

From about 1538, Le Strange's health declined, and his household accounts indicate that he had serious kidney stone problems. Nevertheless, he appears to have died unexpectedly, his will still in draft form. Le Strange died on 16 January 1545, and was buried the next day on the north side of the chancel in the parish church of Hunstanton.

== Marriage and children ==
The Le Strange family was successful in arranging good marriages with wealthy families in this period, and many of the children's marriage were arranged when they were young. A marriage contract was made in July 1501, when Thomas (born about 1490) was still a child. His wife was Anne Vaux (born 1494), daughter of Nicholas Vaux, 1st Baron Vaux of Harrowden and his first wife Elizabeth Fitzhugh, and widow of William Parr (died 1483). Anne Vaux was therefore half sister to Thomas Parr, father of Katherine Parr, sixth queen of King Henry VIII.

Le Strange and Anne Vaux had a large number of children. The exact number is reported differently in various later works, but according to Cord Oestmann, the family's own surviving records give only these 13.

Sons:

- Nicholas le Strange (1 January 1511 – 19 February 1580) was the eldest son and heir.
- William le Strange senior
- Roger le Strange, of Wiveton
- Henry le Strange
- Thomas le Strange (1518–1590).
- William le Strange junior
- Edmund le Strange

Daughters:

- Elizabeth, married John Creesener
- Alice, married Thomas Calthorp
- Anne, married Anthony Southwell
- Katherine married Rowland Clark
- Mary, who married Thomas Prentiss according to Carthew
