= Nicholas Malby =

English soldier

Sir Nicholas Malby (1530?–1584) was an English soldier active in Ireland, Lord President of Connaught from 1579 to 1581.

== Life ==
He was born probably about 1530. In 1556 his name appears in a list of persons willing to take part in the plantation of Leix in Ireland. On 6 August 1562 he was found guilty of coining, and, with three of his associates, was condemned to death; he was, however, reprieved on consenting to serve under Ambrose Dudley, 3rd Earl of Warwick, in France. A man of education, in April 1563 he is described as Warwick's secretary. In 1565 he was sent to Spain, where he was commended for his judicious conduct by Phayre, the English minister at Madrid. On his return to England he was sent to Ireland, and was shortly afterwards appointed sergeant-major of the army by Sir Henry Sidney. After the death of Shane O'Neill in 1567 he was stationed at Carrickfergus in order to assist Captain Piers in keeping the Scots of the Glynns in check. He was reproved by the lords justices for distraining Brian MacPhelim O'Neill's and other Irishmen's cattle for cess, but his conduct was justified by Sir Henry Sidney. His position was a difficult one, and he complained that he had to feed his men at his own cost, but he displayed tact in his management of Sorley Boy MacDonnell, and Sidney, on visiting the north in October 1568, found the charge committed to him in very good state. In July 1569 he was sent to the assistance of Sir Peter Carew against the Butlers, and in a skirmish near Carlow he was hurt by a fall from his horse. He was warmly commended by Sir William Fitzwilliam and Sir Edward Fitton, and on 22 March 1571 he obtained a grant of the office of collector of the customs of Strangford, Ardglass, and Dundrum.

In the spring of 1571 he visited England, where he advocated colonising the north of Ireland with Englishmen to prevent the growth of a Scottish power. On 5 October 1571 he obtained a grant of MacCartan's country, corresponding to the barony of Kinelarty in County Down, on condition that he planted it with civil and loyal subjects before 28 March 1579. On his way back to Ireland in February 1572 he captured a Spanish ship in the English Channel. On 10 April he received a commission to execute martial law in MacCartan's country, but the indiscretion of Thomas Smith in publishing his scheme for the plantation of the Ardes and Upper Clandeboye, by putting the Irish on their guard, placed obstacles in the way of realising his plan. He succeeded in reducing Sir Brian O'Neill to temporary submission in October 1572, and in the following month captured O'Neill's youngest daughter; but, despite efforts with Smith, and at a later period with Walter Devereux, 1st Earl of Essex, he failed to establish himself permanently. Essex chose Malby report to the privy council on the situation of affairs in the north in December 1574. He returned to Ireland on 5 May 1575 with special instructions for the Earl of Essex, and with an order for his own admission to the privy council. He had made a good impression on Robert Dudley, 1st Earl of Leicester and Francis Walsingham, who recommended him to the queen for the government of Connacht, but several months elapsed before their recommendation took effect. During the summer of that year he took part in Essex's expedition against Sorley Boy MacDonnell, and may have assisted at the massacre of the MacDonnells on the island of Rathlin.

== Lord President of Connacht ==
He accompanied Sir Henry Sidney into Connacht in September 1576, and having been knighted by him on 7 October, was appointed colonel, or military governor, of the province (called Connaught by the English). Malby then proceeded against John and Ulick Burke, sons of the Earl of Clanricarde, harrying their countries with fire and sword. In October 1577, after arranging a feud between O'Conor Don and MacDonough, he, at O Connor Sligo's request, attacked the castle of Bundrowes, and having captured it from O'Donnell, restored it to O'Conor Sligo. But not having much confidence in the loyalty of the latter, he appointed Richard MacSwine High Sheriff of Sligo. Shortly afterwards O'Donnell invaded the county, slew the sheriff, and besieged Bundrowes, compelling him to retrace his steps. He drove O'Donnell out of the county, but was unable to overtake him. At Sligo, on his way back to Roscommon, he came to terms with Brian O'Rourke, but the arrangement did not last long, owing to O'Rourke's refusal to expel certain coiners he maintained. In April 1578 Malby invaded his country, captured his chief castle, and put the entire garrison to the sword.

In the autumn of 1578 he went to England, returning to Ireland in May 1579, with the higher title of president of Connaught. After the failure of Essex's colonisation project, his grant of MacCartan's country had been, by Sidney's advice, revoked; but he, on 12 April 1579, received a grant of the manor and lordship of Roscommon, together with an annual rent of 200l. out of the composition paid by the O'Farrells, and certain lands in Longford. During his absence in England his officers and soldiers behaved badly, but Connacht remained tranquil; on the outbreak of James Fitzmaurice's Second Desmond Rebellion in July, Malby, with six hundred troops, marched to Limerick to co-operate with the lord justice, Sir William Drury. Owing to Drury's illness the task of suppressing the rebellion devolved mainly upon him. On 3 October he defeated Sir John and Sir James of Desmond at Monasteranenagh in county Limerick. He strongly suspected the Earl of Desmond of disloyalty, and after several ineffectual efforts to secure his co-operation, treated him as a rebel; while Desmond complained that Malby's severity was a chief cause of his rebellion.

On the arrival of the Earl of Ormonde in November with a commission to command the army in Munster, Malby returned to his charge in Connacht. He belonged to the Leicester faction, and for this and other more personal reasons bore no goodwill to Ormonde, whom he subsequently charged with misrepresenting his services in Munster, and with abetting disorder in Connacht. With the exception of Richard Burke, called Richard of the Iron, or Iron Dick, none of the Connacht chiefs had shown any active sympathy with the Munster rebels. In February 1580 Malby invaded his country and drove him to seek safety among the islands in Clew Bay. After suffering the most terrible privations, Richard of the Iron submitted to the garrison at Burrishoole. During the siege of Carrigafoyle, Malby assisted the operations of the lord justice, Sir William Pelham, with supplies from Connacht. In August O'Rourke, expecting foreign assistance, rebelled and dismantled the castle of Leitrim. Malby immediately took the field against him, repaired and garrisoned the castle, and routed the rebels. Then, hastening to Dublin to the assistance of the lord deputy, Arthur, Lord Grey of Wilton, against Baltinglas and Fiach McHugh O'Byrne, he witnessed the defeat of the English forces at battle of Glenmalure.

O'Rourke was again in arms and Malby returned to Connacht. O'Rourke fled at his approach; but John and Ulick Burke, at the instigation of the catholic bishop of Kilmacduagh, had proclaimed a religious war, and were making efforts to relieve the Spanish at Smerwick. Even after the capture of Smerwick Grey sent reinforcements, but by the end of January 1581 Malby announced success against the rebels. O'Rourke took advantage of the situation, and invaded Roscommon, but Malby sent Captain Brabazon against him, and O'Rourke then sued for peace. Towards the end of February a body of six hundred Scots invaded the province to co-operate with the Burkes, but Malby had notice of their arrival, and drove them across the Moy River. At Strade Abbey, in County Mayo, he decided a controversy between Richard of the Iron Burke and Richard MacOliver, allowing the title of MacWilliam to the former, and making the latter sheriff of the county of Mayo.

In May he agreed to a short peace with the Burkes, intending to visit court, but on the outbreak of hostilities between Turlough Luineach O'Neill and Hugh O'Donnell in July, he was ordered to the assistance of O'Donnell. He marched as far as Lifford, and having destroyed the town, effected a junction with the lord deputy. Towards the close of November he went to England to report on the general situation of affairs in Ireland. But, so far as he was personally concerned, his visit was not successful. Enemies charged him with violent, tyrannical, and corrupt conduct in his administration, and Elizabeth showed a disposition to listen to the charge. He returned to Ireland on 21 May 1582, where early in July, Con O'Donnell, at the instigation of Turlough Luineach, invaded Sligo. Malby complained that the order forbidding him to raise men by cessing them on the country rendered him powerless to meet this danger. But O'Conor Sligo behaved well, and at Malby's approach O'Donnell quickly crossed the Erne River.

After this nothing occurred during his lifetime to disturb the peace of his government. On 4 March 1584 he died at Athlone, feeling ingratitude on the part of the Queen. "He was a man learned in the languages and tongues of the islands of the west of Europe, a brave and victorious man in battles", according to the Annals of the Four Masters, s.a. 1584.

== Family ==
Malby married Thomasine, daughter of Robert Lamb of Leeds, whose wife was a Castell of the Castells of East Hatley in Cambridgeshire. By her he had a son, Henry, who succeeded him, and married Elizabeth, granddaughter of Sir Francis Jobson, lieutenant of the Tower of London; he was killed apparently in November 1602, while serving in Connacht; and a daughter, Ursula, who was married firstly to Anthony Brabazon and secondly to Sir Thomas Burke. Lady Malby subsequently married one George Rawe.
