= Cess =

Tax used for funding social services

Cess (pronounced /sɛs/) is a tax - generally one levied for promoting services like health and education. Governments often charge a cess for the purpose of development in social sectors. The word is a shortened form of "assess". The spelling is due to a mistaken connection with census.

"Cess" (Irish: cis, possibly from Latin census) was an official term used in Ireland from at least the 16th century and when that country formed part of the United Kingdom of Great Britain and Ireland, but has been superseded by "rate". The term was formerly particularly applied to local taxation.

In the British Raj the term was applied, with a qualifying prefix, to any taxation, such as irrigation-cess and educational-cess. Government censuses referred to them collectively as "cesses", as in "land revenue and cesses". In modern India, the word refers to a tax earmarked for a particular purpose, such as education; such cesses are levied as an additional tax on the basic tax-liability.

In Scotland, "cess" refers to the property tax that was enacted there in 1665 and continued to be levied until the 18th century.

The term is used by the rubber industry in Thailand to refer to rubber export tax, which funds that country's Office of Rubber Replanting Aid Fund.

The word has also been used by the Jamaican Ministry of Agriculture and Fisheries to denote a tariff on imports.
