= Chief Justice of Connacht =

The chief justice of Connacht was the senior of the judges who assisted the Lord President of Connaught in judicial matters. Despite the chief justice's title, full judicial powers were vested in the Lord President, whose office was established in 1569. Ralph Rokeby was appointed the first chief justice of Connacht, with Robert Dillon as his second justice. Rokeby found his principal duty as chief justice, the introduction of the common law into Connacht, to be a thankless task, writing gloomily to the Government in London that the people of the province "are not willing to embrace justice".

A royal commission from King James I in 1604 vested in the lord president very wide powers to hear civil cases, to impose martial law and to pursue the King's enemies with "fire and sword" (Ralph Rokeby from the beginning had urged the granting of such powers, arguing that it was the only way to bring order and good government to the province). The extent of these powers gave rise to clashes with the long-established courts and in 1622 official instructions were issued to the Chief Justices of Connacht and Munster not to "intermeddle" with cases which were properly within the jurisdiction of another court.

On the face of it, the office of chief justice was an onerous one, as shown by the fact that (for at least part of the Court's history) he had two or even three associate justices to assist him, whereas the chief justice of Munster as a rule had only one. On the other hand, Geoffrey Osbaldeston's appointment as chief justice in 1606 was generally seen as a demotion on the grounds of his professional incompetence, suggesting that the office was not then considered to be one of great importance. However, a chief justice who performed his duties well could expect to be promoted to a place on the High Court Bench in due course, and Donnellan, Cusack and Jones were rewarded in this way, as was one Attorney General, William Hilton. While it was generally understood that the chief justice of Munster should not hold any other office, the same rule apparently did not apply in Connacht: Thomas Dillon combined the office with a seat on the Court of Common Pleas (Ireland).

We have less information about the men who served as second and third justices. Sir Robert Dillon, later Chief Justice of the Irish Common Pleas, served as second justice (the first holder of the office), and Adam Cusack was second justice in 1662. James Donnellan was third justice in 1627-34. The last second justice seems to have been Justice Johnson (1670-72).

The chief justice was advised by the attorney general for Connacht: the best-known holder of the office was Gerald Comerford (1591-1604), who held the office for life. William Hilton, Attorney General for Connacht 1626-37, is remembered as the brother-in-law of Archbishop James Ussher. John Shadwell, appointed in 1662, appears to have been the last Attorney-General.

The office of chief justice ceased to exist with the abolition of the provincial presidencies in 1672.

== List of chief justices of Connacht 1569-1672 ==
- 1569 Ralph Rokeby
- 1577 Thomas Dillon
- 1606 Henry Dillon
- 1607 Geoffrey Osbaldeston
- 1634 James Donnellan
- 1662 Oliver Jones
- 1670 Adam Cusack

Office abolished 1672

== List of attorneys general for Connacht ==
Incomplete list

- 1591 Gerald Comerford (appointment for life)
- c.1620 Damien Pecke
- 1625 Walter Archer
- 1626 William Hilton
- 1637 Edward Ayscough
- 1649 Oliver Jones (reappointed 1660)
- 1662 John Shadwell

Office abolished 1672

== Sources ==
- Ball, F. Elrington The Judges in Ireland 1221-1921 John Murray London 1926
- Burke, Oliver Anecdotes of the Connaught Circuit Hodges Figgis Dublin 1885
- Crawford, Jon G. A Star Chamber Court in Ireland - the Court of Castle Chamber 1571-1641 Four Courts Press Dublin 2005
- Sir William Petty and George Berkeley Collection of Tracts and Treatises on the Political and Social State of Ireland Reprinted Dublin 1861
- Smyth, Constantine Joseph Chronicle of the Law Officers of Ireland Butterworths London 1839
