= Lord President of Connaught =

The Lord President of Connaught was a military leader with wide-ranging powers, reaching into the civil sphere, in the English government of Connaught in Ireland, in the sixteenth and seventeenth centuries. The office was created in 1569, and in 1604 was reconstituted with full powers to hear all civil suits, to impose martial law and to proceed with "fire and sword" against the King's enemies. The width of his powers gave rise to clashes with the longer established courts: in 1622 he and the Lord President of Munster were ordered not to "intermeddle' in cases which were properly within the remit of those courts. He was assisted by a council whose members included the Chief Justice of Connacht, one or two associate justices and the Attorney General for the Province of Connacht. The office was abolished in 1672.

== List of Lord Presidents of Connaught ==
- 1569-1572 Sir Edward Fitton, the elder
- 1579-1581 Sir Nicholas Malby
- 1584-1597 Richard Bingham
- 1597-1599 Sir Conyers Clifford
- 1604-1616 Richard Burke, 4th Earl of Clanricarde
- 1616-1644 Charles Wilmot, 1st Viscount Wilmot
- Theobald Dillon, 1st Viscount Dillon, according to some sources, had the title from c. 1621, but Wilmot certainly continued in the post for life.
- 1630 (joint) Roger Jones, 1st Viscount Ranelagh
- c.1642 (joint) Thomas Dillon, 4th Viscount Dillon
- 1644-1658 (joint with Dillon) Henry Wilmot, 1st Earl of Rochester
- c.1643 Malachias O'Queely (Confederation)
- 1640s Sir Charles Coote (royalist turned parliamentarian)
- 1661 John Berkeley, 1st Baron Berkeley of Stratton, appointed for life, but the office was abolished in 1672. He died in 1678.

== Deputies and vice-president ==
- 1580-1581 Sir Thomas Norris, acting
- 1596-1597 Sir Thomas Norris, provisional
- 1604-1607 Sir Robert Remington (The History of Parliament: The House of Commons 1604-1629 ed. A. Thrush and J.P. Ferris, vol. 6, pp. 23–24)
- 1610-1615 Sir Oliver St. John (Calendar of State Papers, Ireland, 1608–10, p. 481; Acts of the Privy Council, 1615–16, p. 556)

== See also ==
- Lord President of Munster
- Provinces of Ireland
