= List of MPs elected to the English parliament in 1614 =

This is a list of members of Parliament (MPs) elected to the 2nd parliament in the reign of King James I in 1614, known as the Addled Parliament.

The parliament began on 5 April 1614 and was held to 7 June 1614. It was nicknamed the "Addled Parliament" because of its ineffectiveness. The parliament lasted no more than eight weeks and failed to resolve the conflict between the king, who wished to raise money in the form of a 'Benevolence', a grant of £65,000 and the House of Commons (who were resisting further taxation). It was dissolved by the king.

Prior to 1621 there was no official list of members and the 1614 parliamentary list is incomplete. About 100 MPs are unidentified and 130 are conjectural according to Browne Willis, and these are marked in italics.

In 1985 a more credible list was produced by Maija Jansson as a doctoral thesis.

== List of constituencies and members ==
=== Bedfordshire ===
Constituency	Members	Notes
Bedfordshire	Sir Henry Grey; Sir Oliver Luke	Brown Willis gives Oliver St John instead of Grey
Bedford	Sir Alexander St John; John Leigh	
=== Berkshire ===
Constituency	Members	Notes
Berkshire	Sir Henry Neville; Sir Thomas Parry	Brown Willis gives Francis Knollys as possible instead of Parry. Parry dismissed from parliament 11 May 1614 for electoral malpractices.
Windsor	Sir Richard Lovelace; Thomas Woodward	BW gives Sir Charles Howard and Samuel Backhouse
Reading	Francis Moore; Robert Knollys	
Wallingford	Sir Carew Reynell; Sir George Simeon	BW gives Griffin Payne and Sir William Dunch as possible
Abingdon	Sir Robert Knollys	BW gives Robert Hyde
=== Buckinghamshire ===
Constituency	Members	Notes
Buckinghamshire	Sir Francis Goodwin; Sir William Borlase	Brown Willis gives Sir William Fleetwood instead of Borlase
Buckingham	Sir Thomas Denton; Sir Ralph Winwood	BW gives Thomas Teringham as possible instead of Winwood
Wycombe	Sir Henry Neville Jnr; William Borlase	BW gives John Townsend and Arthur Goodwin as possible Another source gives Richard Lovelace
Aylesbury	Sir John Dormer; Samuel Backhouse	BW gives Sir William Borlase
=== Cambridgeshire ===
Constituency	Members	Notes
Cambridgeshire	Sir John Cutts; Sir Thomas Chicheley	Browne Willis gives Sir John Peyton, 1st Baronet for Chichley
Cambridge University	Sir Miles Sandys; Francis Bacon	BW gives Barnaby Gooch for Bacon
Cambridge	Sir Robert Hitcham; Francis Brakyn	BW gives Sir Thomas Chicheley and Christoper Hodson as possible
=== Cheshire ===
Constituency	Members	Notes
Cheshire	Sir William Brereton; Sir Roger Wilbraham	
City of Chester	Edward Whitby; John Bingley	BW give John Savage as possible for Bingley
=== Cornwall ===
Constituency	Members	Notes
Cornwall	Richard Carew; John St Aubyn	Browne Willis gives Sir William Godolphin
Launceston	Sir Charles Wilmot; William Croft	BW gives Sir Thomas Lake
Liskeard	Richard Connock; John Glanville	BW gives Sir Joseph Killigrew & Nicholas Hele
Lostwithiel	Edward Leech; Sir Henry Vane	BW gives Sir William Lower & George Chudleigh
Truro	Thomas Russell; Thomas Burgess	BW gives Thomas Harris
Bodmin	Christopher Spray; Richard Edgecumbe	BW gives Nicholas Connock
Helston	Sir Robert Killigrew; Henry Bulstrode	BW gives Robert Naunton
Saltash	Ranulph Crew; Sir Robert Phelips	BW gives as possible Sir Peter Manwood; Sir Thomas Smith
Camelford	George Cotton; Robert Naunton	BW gives Philip Courtman as possible
Westlow	Sir Edward Lewknor; John Harris	
Grampound	Sir Francis Barnham; Thomas St Aubyn	BW gives Sir Robert Carey
Eastlow	Sir Reginald Mohun, Bt; George Chudleigh	BW gives Jerome Horsey
Bossiney	John Wood; Sir Jerome Horsey	BW gives Thomas Hitchcock as possible
Penryn	Sir William Killigrew; Sir Francis Crane	BW gives Sir William Maynard as possible
Tregoney	William Hakewill and Thomas Malet	
Fowey	Jonathan Rashleigh; Sir Edward Boys	BW gives Sir Robert Wynde as possible
St Ives	Sir Joseph Killigrew; Thomas Tindall	BW gives John Lord Pawlet
Mitchell	Christopher Hodson; Walter Hickman	BW gives Richard Carew and William Hakewill
St Germans	John Elliott; John Trott	
St Mawes	Francis Vyvyan; Sir Nicholas Smith	BW gives as possible Dudley Carlton and Henry Binge
Newport	Thomas Trevor; Sir Thomas Cheeke	BW gives Sir Robert Killigrew
Callington	William Rolle; Humphrey Were	BW gives Henry Rolleand Sir Roger Wilbraham as possible
=== Cumberland ===
Constituency	Members	Notes
Cumberland	Sir Wilfred Lawson; Sir Thomas Penruddock	Browne Willis gives Sir George Dalston
Carlisle	George Butler; Nathaniel Tomkins	BW gives Sir Henry Fane (Vane)
=== Derbyshire ===
Constituency	Members	Notes
Derbyshire	William Lord Cavendish; Henry Howard	
Derby	Sir Gilbert Kniveton; Arthur Turner	Browne Willis gives Sir Edward Leeche
=== Devon ===
Constituency	Members	Notes
Devon	Sir Edward Giles; John Drake	Browne Willis gives Sir Edward Seymour for Giles
Exeter	John Prowse; Thomas Martyn	
Totnes	Nathaniel Rich; Lawrence Adams	BW gives Sir Edward Giles and Christopher Brakyn
Barnstaple	John Delbridge; John Gostlin	
Plymouth	William Strode; Thomas Sherville	BW gives John Glanville for Strode
Plympton Erle	Sampson Hele; Sir Warwick Hele	BW give Sir William Strode for Sampson Hele
Tavistock	Francis Glanville; Edward Duncombe	
Bere Alston	Thomas Crewe; Sir Richard White	BW gives John Cage and Edward Bertlet as possible
Clifton Dartmouth Hardness	Thomas Holland; Thomas Gournay	BW gives Humphrey Weare
=== Dorset ===
Constituency	Members	Notes
Dorset	Sir John Strangways; Sir Mervyn Audley	Browne Willis gives Sir Thomas Freke
Poole	Sir Walter Erle; Sir Thomas Walsingham, jnr	BW gives Edward Man Jansson
Dorchester	Francis Ashley; George Horsey	BW gives Richard Bulstrode as possible
Lyme Regis	Sir Edward Seymour, 2nd Baronet; George Browne	John Poulett and Robert Hassard
Weymouth and Melcombe Regis	Sir Charles Caesar; Robert Bateman; Barnard Michell; John Roy	BW gives as possible Giles Green and John Freke
Bridport	Sir William Bamfield; John Jeffrey	BW gives John Browne as possible
Shaftesbury	Sir Miles Sandys; Henry Croke	Sandys sat for Cambridge University – replaced by Sir Simon Steward
Wareham	William Pitt; John Freke	
Corfe Castle	John Dackombe; Sir Thomas Tracy	BW gives Sir Christopher Hatton for Tracy
=== Essex ===
Constituency	Members	Notes
Essex	Sir Robert Rich; Sir Richard Weston	Browne Willis gives Theophilus Lord Howard and Sir Gamaliel Capel
Colchester	Robert Barker; Edward Alford	
Maldon	Sir John Sammes; Charles Chiborne	
Harwich	Sir Harbottle Grimston; Sir Robert Mansell	Mansell opted to sit for Carmarthenshire - replaced by Sir Charles Montagu
=== Gloucestershire ===
Constituency	Members	Notes
Gloucestershire	Sir Richard Berkeley; Sir William Cooke	
Gloucester	Thomas Machen; John Browne	Browne Willis gives Richard Overbury and Christopher Caple
Cirencester	Sir Anthony Manie; Robert Strange	BW gives Lord Newborough and Sir Thomas Roe
Tewkesbury	Sir Dudley Digges; Sir John Ratcliffe	BW gives Giles Brydges in place of Ratcliffe
=== Hampshire ===
Constituency	Members	Notes
Hampshire	Richard Tichborne; Sir William Uvedale	Browne Willis gives Sir Henry Wallop
Winchester	William Sandys; Sir Thomas Bilson	BW gives Richard Tichborne and William Savage possible
Southampton	Sir Thomas Fleming; Thomas Cheeke	BW gives Henry Sherfield
Portsmouth	John Griffith; George Thorpe	BW gives Sir Daniel Norton as possible
Petersfield	Sir Walter Tichborne; Walter Savage	
Yarmouth, Isle of Wight	Arthur Bromfield; Thomas Cheeke, jnr	
Newport, Isle of Wight	Sir Richard Worsley, 1st Baronet; John Searle	BW gives Richard James
Newtown, Isle of Wight	William Higford; Sir Henry Berkeley	BW gives Sir Thomas Barrington as possible
Lymington	Philip Fleming; Charles Thynne	BW gives Thomas Marshall
Christchurch	Sir Thomas Norton; Henry Breton	BW gives Nathaniel Tomkins and Sir William Uvedale as possible
Stockbridge	Sir Henry Wallop; Sir Walter Cope	Election voided. Both re-elected May 1614; BW gives John St John and Sir Richard Gifford
Whitchurch	Sir Edward Barrett; Sir Richard Pawlett	BW gives Sir Walter Chute for Barrett
Andover	Richard Venables; Peter Noyes	
=== Herefordshire ===
Constituency	Members	Notes
Herefordshire	Sir James Scudamore; Sir Herbert Croft	
Hereford	John Hoskins; John Warden	
Leominster	Sir Humphrey Baskerville; Thomas Coningsby	Browne Willis gives Sir Ralph Coningsby and William Beecher
=== Hertfordshire ===
Constituency	Members	Notes
Hertfordshire	Sir Henry Cary; Ralph Coningsby	
St Albans	Sir Francis Bacon; Henry Finch	Francis Bacon sat for Cambridge University - replaced by Thomas Perient
=== Huntingdonshire ===
Constituency	Members	Notes
Huntingdonshire	Sir Oliver Cromwell; Sir Robert Payne	Browne Willis gives Sir Robert Cotton Bt for Payne
Huntingdon	Sir Christopher Hatton; Sir Miles Fleetwood	
=== Kent ===
Constituency	Members	Notes
Kent	Sir Peter Manwood; Sir Thomas Walsingham	Browne Willis gives Sir Robert Sidney and Sir Robert Scott
Canterbury	George Newman; Sir William Lovelace	BW gives John Finch (recorder)
Rochester	Sir Edward Hoby; Sir Edwin Sandys	BW gives Sir Thomas Walsingham for Hoby
Maidstone	Sir Francis Fane; Sir John Scott	BW gives Sir Francis Barnham for Scott
Queenborough	Robert Palmer; Robert Hatton	BW gives Sir Edward Hobby and Thomas Culpepper
=== Lancashire ===
Constituency	Members	Notes
Lancashire	Sir Thomas Gerard, 1st Baronet; Sir Cuthbert Halsall	BW gives Sir Gilbert Hoghton and Sir John Radcliff
Preston	Sir Edward Mosley; Henry Banister	
Lancaster	Sir Thomas Fanshawe; William Fanshawe	BW gives Sir Humphrey May for William Fanshawe
Newton	William Ashton; Roger Charnock	BW gives Sir Miles Fleetwood and Sir Thomas Gerard
Wigan	Gilbert Gerard; Sir Richard Molyneux	BW gives Sir William Cooke
Clitheroe	Sir Gilbert Hoghton, 2nd Baronet; Clement Coke	BW gives William Fanshaw
Liverpool	Thomas Ireland; Sir Hugh Beeston	BW gives Thomas May and William Johnson
=== Leicestershire ===
Constituency	Members	Notes
Leicestershire	Sir George Hastings; Sir Thomas Hesilrige	
Leicester	Sir Henry Rich; Sir Francis Leigh	
=== Lincolnshire ===
Constituency	Members	Notes
Lincolnshire	Sir George Manners; Sir Peregrine Bertie	Browne Willis gives Sir Thomas Grantham and Sir John Sheffield
Lincoln	Sir Thomas Grantham; Edward Bash	BW gives Sir Lewis Watson, Bt and Sir Edward Ayscough
Boston	Anthony Irby; Leonard Bawtrey	
Great Grimsby	Sir John Wray; Richard Toothby	BW gives Sir Christopher Wray
Stamford	Richard Cecil; John Jay	
Grantham	Sir George Reynell; Richard Tufton	BW gives Sir George Manners
=== Middlesex ===
Constituency	Members	Notes
Middlesex	Sir Julius Caesar; Sir Thomas Lake	Browne Willis gives Sir Robert Wroth
Westminster	Sir Humphrey May; Edmund Doubleday	BW gives Sir Walter Cope
City of London	Sir Henry Montague; Nicholas Fuller; Sir Thomas Lowe; Robert Middleton	BW gives Robert Bateman for Middleton
=== Monmouthshire ===
Constituency	Members	Notes
Monmouthshire	Walter Montagu; William Jones	Browne Willis gives Sir Edward Morgan
Monmouth Boroughs	Sir Robert Johnson	
=== Norfolk ===
Constituency	Members	Notes
Norfolk	Sir Henry Bedingfield; Sir Hamon L'Estrange	Browne Willis gives Nathaniel Bacon and Sir Charles Cornwallis
Norwich	Sir Thomas Hyrne; Richard Gwinne	
King's Lynn	Matthew Clerke; Thomas Oxborough	BW gives Sir Robert Hitcham
Great Yarmouth	George Hardware; Sir Theophilus Finch, 2nd Baronet	BW gives Sir Henry Hobart for Finch
Thetford	Sir William Twysden, 1st Baronet; Framlingham Gawdy	BW gives Robert Spiller and Sir Hamon le Strange as possible
Castle Rising	Sir Robert Wynd; Thomas Binge	BW gives Sir Thomas Holland and Sir Robert Townsend
=== Northamptonshire ===
Constituency	Members	Notes
Northamptonshire	Sir Edward Montagu; Sir William Tate	
Peterborough	Sir William Walter; Roger Manwood	Browne Willis gives Edward Wymark and Sir Walter Montague as possible
Northampton	Henry Yelverton; Francis Beale	BW gives Thomas Crew as possible for Beale
Brackley	Sir William Spencer; Arthur Terringham	BW gives Ranulph Crewe and Sir William Tate as possible
Higham Ferrers	Rowland St John	BW gives Sir Charles Montague
=== Northumberland ===
Constituency	Members	Notes
Northumberland	Sir Henry Widdrington; Sir George Selby	Selby declared ineligible as Sheriff of Durham and replaced by his brother Sir William Selby
Newcastle	Sir Henry Anderson; William Jenison II	
Morpeth	Sir William Button; Arnold Herbert	BW givesSir Christopher Perkins
Berwick upon Tweed	Sir John Selby; Meredith Morgan	BW givesSir William Selby as possible
=== Nottinghamshire ===
Constituency	Members	Notes
Nottinghamshire	Sir John Holles; Sir Gervase Clifton	
Nottingham	William Gregory; Robert Stables	BW gives Sir William Willoughby as possible
East Retford	Sir William Cavendish; Sir Walter Chute	BW gives Sir Nathaniel Rich and Sir Richard Williamson as possible
=== Oxfordshire ===
Constituency	Members	Notes
Oxfordshire	Sir Anthony Cope, 1st Baronet; Sir John Croke	
Oxford University	Sir John Bennet; Sir Daniel Donne	
Oxford	Sir John Astley; Thomas Wentworth	
Woodstock	James Whitelocke; Sir Philip Cary	
Banbury	Sir William Cope, 2nd Baronet	
=== Rutland ===
Constituency	Members	Notes
Rutland	Sir Guy Palmes; Basil Fielding	
=== Salop ===
Constituency	Members	Notes
Shropshire	Richard Newport; Sir Roger Owen	Browne Willis givesSir Francis Lacon as possible
Shrewsbury	Lewis Prowde; Francis Berkeley	BW gives Sir Roger Owen
Bridgnorth	John Pierse; Richard Singe	BW gives Sir Thomas Bromley as possible
Ludlow	Sir Henry Townsend; Robert Berry	Berry declared ineligible-replaced by Robert Lloyd; BW gives Sir William Walter
Much Wenlock	Rowland Lacon; Edward Lawley	BW gives Robert Lawley as possible
Bishops Castle	Edward Littleton, 1st Baron Lyttleton of Mounslow; Thomas Hitchcock	BW gives Sir John Brook
=== Somerset ===
Constituency	Members	Notes
Somerset	Maurice Berkeley; John Poulett	Browne Willis gives Sir Robert Phelips and Sir Francis Hastings
Bristol	John Whitson; Thomas James	
Bath	Sir James Ley; Nicholas Hyde	
Wells	Thomas Southwood; Sidney Montagu	
Taunton	John Donne; James Clarke	BW gives Sir Maurice Berkeley
Bridgwater	Thomas Ware; Robert Halswell	BW gives Roger Warr
Minehead	No return	
=== Staffordshire ===
Constituency	Members	Notes
Staffordshire	Sir Walter Chetwynd; Thomas Crompton	BW gives Sir Edward Lyttelton and Sir William Bowyer
Lichfield	Sir John Egerton; William Wingfield	Egerton died and replaced by Anthony Dyott; BW gives Richard Weston (Royalist)|Richard Weston
Stafford	Sir Walter Devereux; Thomas Gibbs	BW gives Sir Walter Chetwynd
Newcastle under Lyme	Robert Needham; Edward Wymarke	BW gives Edward Kyrton and John Davies as possible
Tamworth	Sir Thomas Roe; Sir Percival Willoughby	BW gives John Ferrers and Basil Fielding as possible
=== Suffolk ===
Constituency	Members	Notes
Suffolk	Sir Thomas Jermyn; Sir Robert Gardener	
Ipswich	Sir Francis Bacon; William Cage	Bacon sat for Cambridge Univ, replaced by Robert Snelling
Dunwich	Philip Gawdy; Henry Dade	Browne Wllis gives Sir Robert Yaxley and Edmund Doubleday
Orford	Sir William Cornwallis; Sir Francis Baildon	BW gives Sir Robert Gardiner as possible
Eye	Sir Robert Drury; Huntingdon Colby	BW gives Sir John Crompton and Sir William Croft
Aldeburgh	Sir Henry Glemham; Sir William Woodhouse	BW gives Sir John Samms as possible
Sudbury	Robert Crane; Henry Binge	BW gives Charles Cibborne and William Towse as possible
Bury St Edmunds	Bury St Edmunds not enfranchised in 1614. (Town charter not yet signed)	BW gives Sir Thomas Jermyn and Robert Crane
=== Surrey ===
Constituency	Members	Notes
Surrey	Sir George More; Sir Edmund Bowyer	Browne Willis gives Sir Robert More for Sir George More
Southwark	Edward Cox; Richard Yarward	BE gives Sir George Rivers
Bletchingly	Sir John Trevor; Sir Charles Howard	BW gives Sir Charles Caesar and Lewis Prowde
Reigate	Sir Edward Howard; John Suckling	BW gives Sir Thomas Heyward as possible
Gatton	Sir Thomas Gresham; Sir John Brooke	
Guildford	Sir Robert More; George Stoughton	BW gives Sir George Moor and Thomas Trevor
Haslemere	Sir Thomas Grimes; Sir William Browne	
=== Sussex ===
Constituency	Members	Notes
Sussex	Sir Walter Covert; Sampson Lennard	Browne Willis gives Sir Edward Sackville
Chichester	Adrian Stoughton; Sir John Morley	BW gives Sir Edward Cecil for Morley
Horsham	John Middleton; Sir Thomas Vavasor	
Midhurst	Sir Thomas Bowyer, 1st Baronet; William Courteman	BW gives Sir Anthony Maynye and Francis Nevill
Lewes	Christopher Neville; Richard Amhurst	BW gives Sir Robert Payne for Neville
New Shoreham	Sir Charles Howard; Thomas Shelley	BW gives Sir John Morley and Sir Hugh Beeston
Bramber	Sir John Leedes; Henry Shelley, Jnr	BW gives Robert Morley and Thomas Bowyer
Steyning	Thomas Shirley; Sir Edward Fraunceys	
East Grinstead	Sir Henry Compton; George Rivers	BW gives Leonard Dawtry as possible
Arundel	Henry Spiller; Edward Morley	BW gives Sir Lionel Cranfield and Sir William Tey
=== Warwickshire ===
Constituency	Members	Notes
Warwickshire	Sir Thomas Lucy; Sir Richard Verney	
Coventry	Sampson Hopkins; Sir Robert Coke	
Warwick	John Townsend; Greville Verney	
=== Westmorland ===
Constituency	Members	Notes
Westmorland	Sir Thomas Wharton; Sir Henry Clifford	
Appleby	Sir George Savile, junior Sir Henry Wotton	
=== Wiltshire ===
Constituency	Members	Notes
Wiltshire	Sir Thomas Howard; Sir Henry Poole	Browne Willis gives Sir Francis Popham and Sir Edward Baynton
Salisbury	Giles Tooker; Roger Gauntlett	
Wilton	Thomas Morgan; Sir Robert Sidney	
Downton	Gilbert Ralegh; John Ryves	BW gives Sir Carew Raleigh and William Hendon
Hindon	Sir Edmund Ludlow; Sir Edwin Sandys	Sandys sat for Rochester- replaced by Henry Mervyn
Heytesbury	Henry Ludlow; Walter Gawen	
Chippenham	Sir William Maynard; Thomas Colepeper	BW gives Edward Hungerford and Robert Keilway
Calne	Sir Edmund Carey; Richard Lowe	BW gives John Dunne
Devizes	Sir Edward Baynton; William Kent	BW gives Sir Mervyn Awdley and Sir Carew Reynell
Ludgershall	Charles Danvers; James Kirton	BW gives Sir Charles Wilmot and John Thorp
Great Bedwyn	Robert Hyde; Sir Giles Mompesson	BW gives Anthony Hungerford for Hyde
Cricklade	Sir Thomas Monson, 1st Baronet; Sir John Eyre	BW gives Sir Neville Poole and Sir Carew Reynolds
Malmesbury	Sir Roger Dallison; Sir Neville Poole	BW gives Sir Henry Poole
Westbury	Henry Ley; Matthew Ley	BW gives Sir James Ley for Henry Ley
Old Sarum	William Ravenscroft; William Price	BW gives possible George Myne and Sir Robert Brett
Wootton Bassett	Sir William Willoughby; Edward Hungerford	BW gives Thomas Martin and Henry Mervyn
Marlborough	Richard Digges; Sir Francis Popham	BW gives Laurence Hyde for Popham
=== Worcestershire ===
Constituency	Members	Notes
Worcestershire	Sir Thomas Bromley; Sir Samuel Sandys	Browne Willis gives Sir Thomas Lyttelton for Bromley
Worcester	Thomas Chettle; John Coucher	BW gives Sir Robert Berkley
Droitwich	Sir Edwin Sandys; Ralph Clare	
Evesham	Sir Thomas Biggs, 1st Baronet; Anthony Langston	BW gives Thomas Hickman for Langston
Bewdley	James Button	BW gives Sir Thomas Edmondes
=== Yorkshire ===
Constituency	Members	Notes
Yorkshire	John Savile, 1st Baron Savile of Pontefract; Thomas Wentworth, 1st Earl of Strafford	
York	Sir Robert Askwith; Christopher Brooke	
Kingston upon Hull	Sir John Bourchier; Richard Burgis	
Knaresborough	Sir Henry Slingsby; William Beecher	
Scarborough	Edward Smith; William Conyers	Browne Willis gives Sir Thomas Posthumous Hoby
Ripon	Sir Thomas Posthumous Hoby; William Mallory	BW gives Sir Thomas Vavasor and William Mallory
Richmond	Sir Talbot Bowes; Sir William Richardson	BW gives William Bowes for Richardson
Beverley	Edmund Scott; William Towse	BW gives Sir Walter Covert as possible
Hedon	Sir Christopher Hilliard; Clement Coke	Coke elected to sit for Clitheroe – replaced by William Sheffield
Thirsk	Thomas Belasyse; Sir Robert Yaxley	BW gives John Gibb and Sir Henry Belasyse as possible
Aldborough	Sir Henry Savile, 1st Baronet; George Wetherid	BW gives Edmund Scot as possible
Boroughbridge	Sir Ferdinando Fairfax; George Marshall	BW gives Sir John Ferne and John Bingley
=== Cinque Ports ===
Constituency	Members	Notes
Hastings	Sir Edward Hales, Bt; James Lasher	BW gives Sir Henry Wotton as possible
Sandwich	Thomas Smythe; Sir Samuel Peyton, 1st Baronet	BW gives Robert Hatton
Dover	Sir George Fane; Sir Robert Brett	BW gives George Bing
New Romney	Sir Arthur Ingram; Robert Wilcock	BW gives Sir William Budden and George Newman
Hythe	Sir Richard Smith; Sir Lionel Cranfield	BW gives Nicholas Smith and Sir Edward Hales Bt
Rye	Edward Hendon; Thomas Watson	BW gives Sampson Leonard as possible
Winchelsea	William Binge; Thomas Godfrey (MP)	BW gives Sir Edward Barret as possible
=== Wales ===
Constituency	Members	Notes
Anglesey	Sir Richard Bulkeley	
Beaumaris	William Jones	
Brecknockshire	Sir Charles Vaughan	BW gives Sir Henry Williams
Brecknock	Sir John Crompton	
Cardiganshire	Richard Pryse	
Cardigan	Robert Wolverstone	
Carmarthenshire	Sir Robert Mansell	
Carmarthen	William Thomas	BW gives Sir Robert Mansfield
Carnarvonshire	Richard Wynn	
Carnarvon	Nicholas Griffith	
Denbighshire	Simon Thelwall	BW gives Sir John Trevor as possible
Denbigh Boroughs	Hugh Myddelton	
Flintshire	Robert Ravenscroft	BW gives Roger Puleston
Flint	John Eyton	BW gives William Ravenscroft
Glamorgan	Sir Thomas Mansell	replaced Herbert ennobled
Cardiff	Matthew Davies	BW gives William Thomas
Merioneth	Ellis Lloyd	
Montgomeryshire	William Herbert	
Montgomery	Sir John Danvers	BW gives Edward Herbert
Pembrokeshire	John Wogan	BW gives Sir James Parry
Pembroke	Sir Walter Devereux	
Haverford West	Sir James Perrot	
Radnorshire	James Price	
Radnor	Rowland Meyrick	BW gives Sir Robert Harley as possible

== See also ==
- List of parliaments of England
- Addled Parliament
