= Robert Spiller =

English landowner and politician (1591–1637)

Sir Robert Spiller (c. 1591–1637) was an English landowner and politician who sat in the House of Commons between 1621 and 1624.

== Early life ==
Spiller was the son of Sir Henry Spiller of Laleham. He matriculated at Trinity College, Oxford on 25 January 1610 aged 18 and was awarded BA on 28 January 1611.

== Career ==
He was a student of Lincoln's Inn in 1611 and became a clerk in Chancery.

In 1621 he was elected member of parliament for Castle Rising. He was of Sutton in Surrey and was knighted at Guildford on 27 July 1622 together with Sir Richard Weston. In 1624 he was elected MP for Castle Rising again.

In 1635 Spiller was one of the commissioners appointed for the Wey Navigation.

== Personal life ==
Spiller married Elizabeth (or Dorothy) Dormer, daughter of Sir John Dormer. They had a daughter Jane who married James Herbert son of Philip Herbert, 4th Earl of Pembroke.

Spiller died at the age of about 47 and was buried at Shepperton, Middlesex on 21 May 1637.

Parliament of England
Preceded by Sir Robert Wynde; Thomas Byng	Member of Parliament for Castle Rising; 1621–1624; With: John Wilson 1621–1622; Sir Thomas Bancroft 1624	Succeeded by Sir Hamon le Strange; Sir Thomas Bancroft
