= Sir Thomas Monson, 1st Baronet =

English politician and courtier (1565–1641)

Sir Thomas Monson Bt
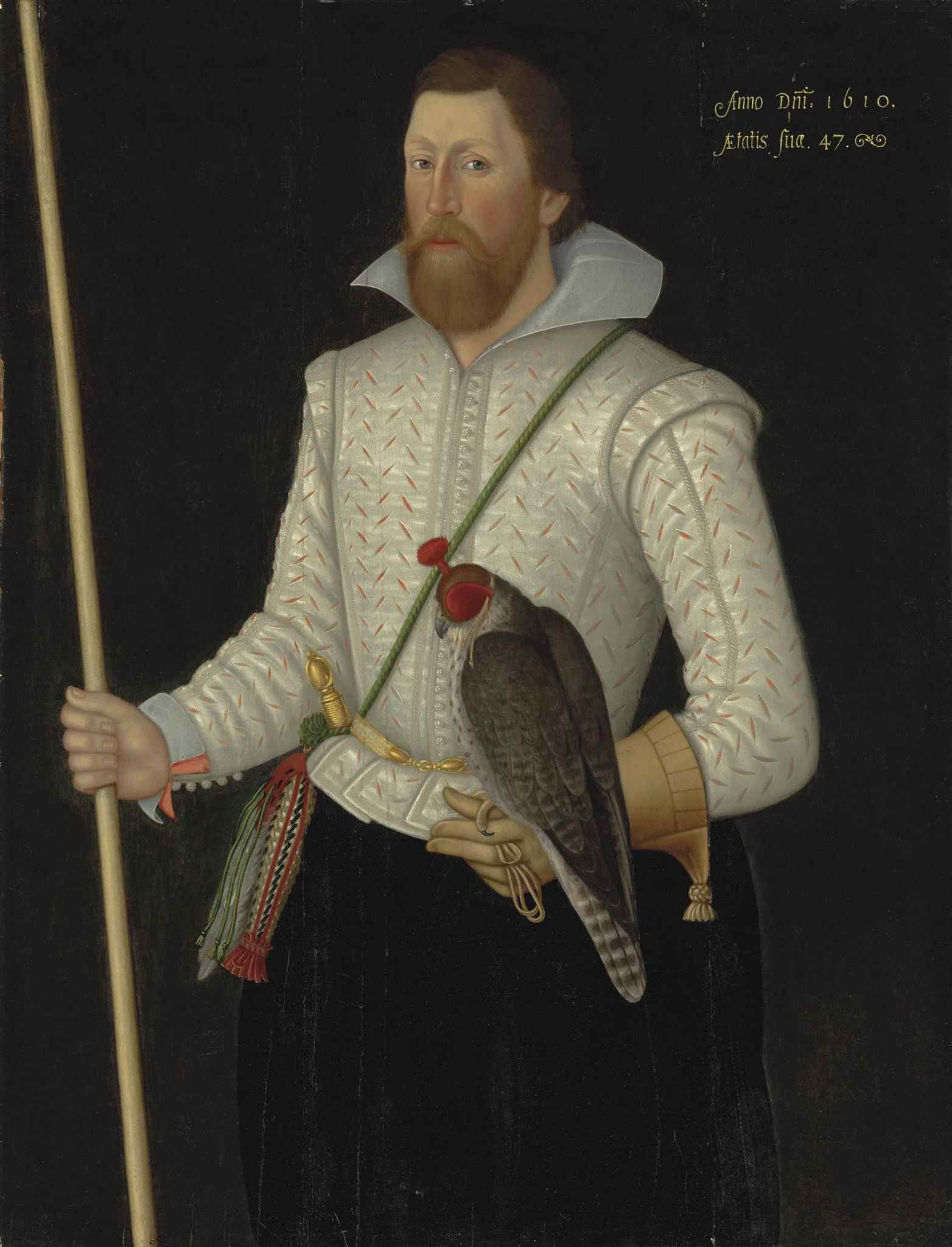
- Sir Thomas Monson aged 47, 1610, by an unknown English artist

Member of the English Parliament for Lincolnshire
- In office 1597–1598 Serving with William Pelham
- Preceded by: Sir Edward Dymoke; George St Paul
- Succeeded by: John Sheffield; William Wray

Member of the English Parliament for Castle Rising
- In office 1604–1611 Serving with Sir Robert Townshend
- Preceded by: John Peyton; Robert Townshend
- Succeeded by: Sir Robert Wynde; Thomas Byng

Member of the English Parliament for Cricklade
- In office 1614–1614 Serving with Sir John Eyre
- Preceded by: Sir John Hungerford; Sir Henry Poole
- Succeeded by: Sir Thomas Howard; Sir Carew Reynell

Sir Thomas Monson, 1st Baronet, of Carlton (1565 – 29 May 1641) was an English politician and supporter of King James I.

== Background ==
Sir Thomas was the son of Sir John Monson of South Carlton, Lincolnshire, a past High Sheriff of Lincolnshire. Sir Thomas's younger brother was Admiral Sir William Monson. Thomas was educated at Magdalen College, Oxford, matriculating at the age of fifteen in December 1579, and at Gray's Inn, where he was admitted a student in 1583.

== Career ==
Sir Thomas was appointed a Justice of the Peace in 1592 and High Sheriff of Lincolnshire for 1597 and probably knighted the same year. He then served as a Member of Parliament for Lincolnshire (1597–1598), Castle Rising (1604–1611), and finally Cricklade in 1614.

Under James I Monson thrived. He was made Chancellor of the English jointure lands of the king's wife Anne of Denmark in 1603. He was made Keeper of the Armoury at Greenwich, Master of the Armoury at the Tower of London, and Master Falconer to the King.

He was created a hereditary baronet in 1611, one of the first in the Baronetage of England. But in 1615 his position of trust at the Tower of London brought about a situation which led to his arrest as one of the participators in the 1613 murder of Sir Thomas Overbury. He was eventually released however, after a year in the Tower, his reputation and finances ruined.

== Family ==
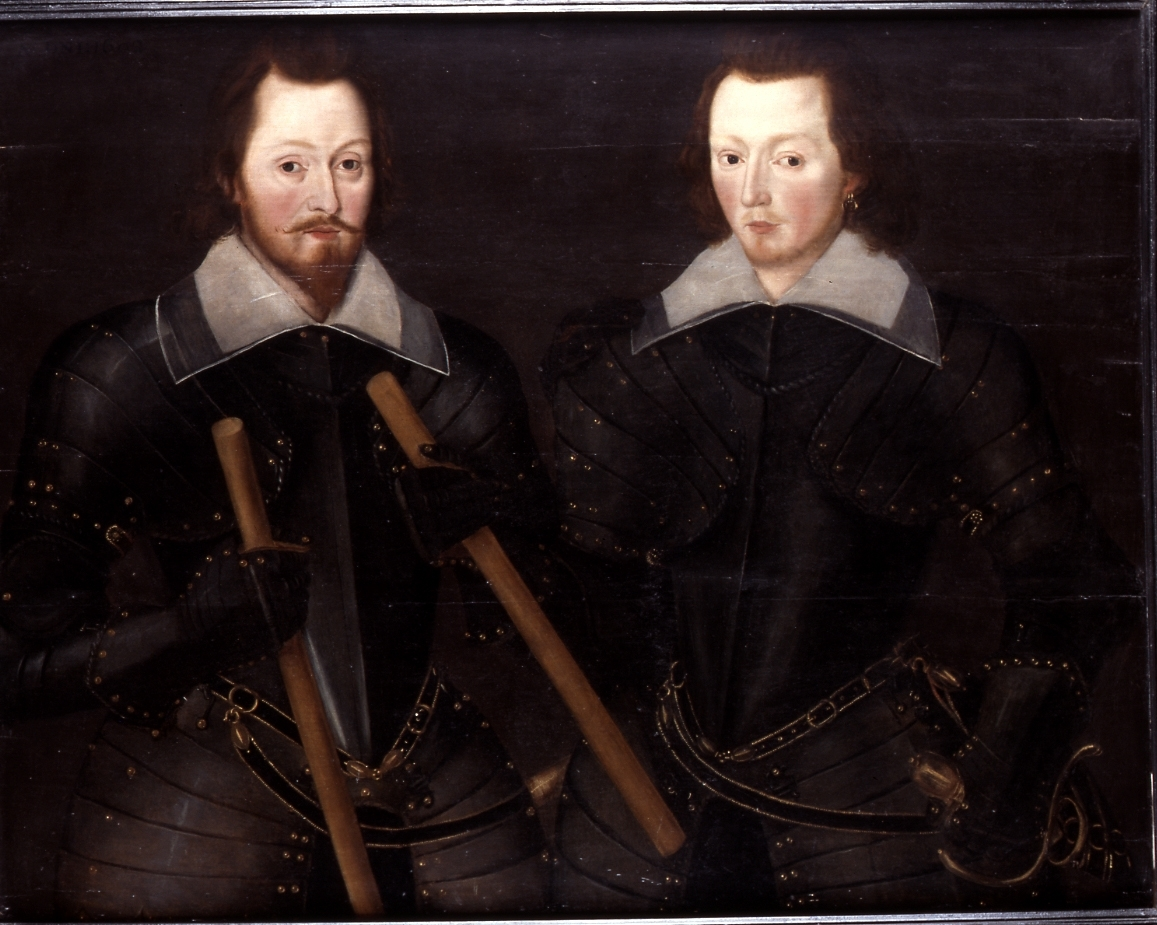
Sir Thomas Monson and his son John, who succeeded him as baronet.

He died in 1641 and was buried in South Carlton. He had married Margaret Anderson, the daughter of Sir Edmund Anderson, with whom he had four sons and five daughters. His eldest son and heir was John Monson (1600–1683), a member of parliament under Charles I.

His nephew, William Monson (c. 1607–1678), was created an Irish peer as Viscount Monson of Castlemaine in 1628. Having been a member of the court which tried Charles I the viscount was deprived of his honours and was sentenced to imprisonment for life in 1661.

Parliament of England
Preceded by Sir Edward Dymoke; George St Paul	Member of Parliament for Lincolnshire; 1597–1598; With: William Pelham	Succeeded by John Sheffield; William Wray
Preceded by John Peyton; Robert Townshend	Member of Parliament for Castle Rising; 1604–1611; With: Sir Robert Townshend	Succeeded by Sir Robert Wynde; Thomas Byng
Preceded by Sir John Hungerford; Sir Henry Poole	Member of Parliament for Cricklade; 1614; With: Sir John Eyre	Succeeded by Sir Thomas Howard; Sir Carew Reynell
Baronetage of England
New creation	Baronet (of Carleton); 1611–1641	Succeeded by John Monson
