= Sir Robert Cotton, 1st Baronet, of Connington =

English antiquarian (1570/71–1631)

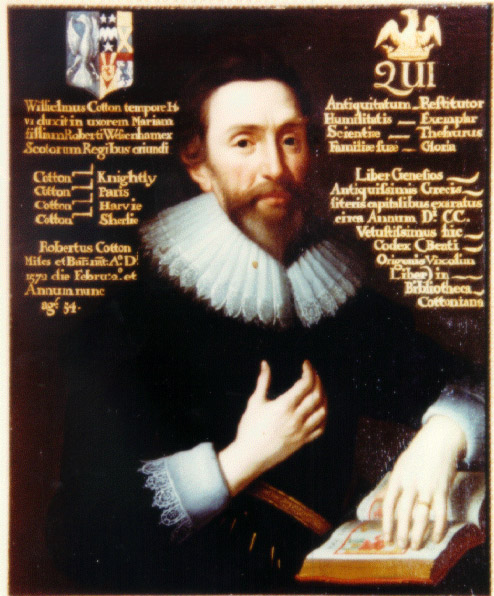
- Portrait of Robert Cotton, commissioned 1626 and attributed to Cornelis Janssens van Ceulen

Member of the English Parliament for Newtown
- In office 1601–1601 Serving with Robert Wroth
- Preceded by: Sylvanus Scory; Thomas Crompton
- Succeeded by: Sir John Stanhope; William Meux

Member of the English Parliament for Huntingdonshire
- In office 1604–1611 Serving with Sir Oliver Cromwell
- Preceded by: Sir Gervase Clifton; Oliver Cromwell
- Succeeded by: Sir Robert Payne; Sir Oliver Cromwell

Member of the English Parliament for Old Sarum
- In office 1624–1624 Serving with Michael Oldisworth
- Preceded by: George Myne; Thomas Brett
- Succeeded by: Sir John Stradling; Michael Oldisworth

Member of the English Parliament for Thetford
- In office 1625–1625 Serving with Framlingham Gawdy
- Preceded by: Framlingham Gawdy; Drue Drury
- Succeeded by: Framlingham Gawdy; Sir John Hobart, Bt

Member of the English Parliament for Castle Rising
- In office 1628–1629 Serving with Sir Thomas Bancroft
- Preceded by: Sir Hamon le Strange; Sir Thomas Bancroft
- Succeeded by: Parliament suspended until 1640

Personal details
- Born: Robert Bruce Cotton; 22 January 1570/1 Denton, Cambridgeshire, England
- Died: 6 May 1631
- Children: Sir Thomas Cotton, 2nd Baronet; Roland Rowland Cotton (Saltonstall) II of Derby

Sir Robert Bruce Cotton, 1st Baronet (22 January 1570/71 – 6 May 1631) of Conington Hall in the parish of Conington in Huntingdonshire, England, was a Member of Parliament and an antiquarian who founded the Cotton library.

== Origins ==
Sir Robert Cotton was born on 22 January 1571 in Denton, Huntingdonshire, the son and heir of Thomas Cotton (1544–1592) of Conington (son of Thomas Cotton of Conington, Sheriff of Cambridgeshire and Huntingdonshire in 1547.) by his first wife, Elizabeth Shirley, a daughter of Francis Shirley of Staunton Harold, Leicestershire. His family claimed descent from the Bruce line of Scotland, and Cotton took considerable pride in this supposed connection with the Scottish royal line, and often styled himself as Robert Bruce Cotton.

The Cotton family originated at the manor of Cotton, Cheshire, from where they took their surname. They were prominent in Shropshire by the 16th century with centres of power at Alkington and Norton in Hales where a member of the family, Rowland Cotton, gave one of the first architectural commissions to Inigo Jones. The family was close to polymath and antiquarian Sir Rowland Hill, publisher of the Geneva Bible.

== Education ==
Cotton was educated at King's School, Peterborough and Westminster School where he was a pupil of the antiquarian William Camden, under whose influence he began to study antiquarian topics. He began collecting rare manuscripts as well as collecting notes on the history of Huntingdonshire when he was seventeen. He proceeded to Jesus College, Cambridge, where he graduated BA in 1585 and in 1589 entered the Middle Temple to study law. He began to amass a library in which the documents and manuscripts rivalled, then surpassed, the royal manuscript collections. One of the most valuable documents he collected is the Lindisfarne Gospels.

== Career ==
Cotton was elected a Member of Parliament for Newtown, Isle of Wight in 1601 and as Knight of the Shire for Huntingdonshire in 1604.

He helped to devise the institution of the title of baronet as a means for King James I to raise funds: like a peerage, a baronetcy was heritable but, like a knighthood, it gave the holder no seat in the House of Lords.

One of his scarce monographs, Twenty-Four Arguments, proposed the bolstering of royal powers to suppress Catholic elements in England in the wake of the Popery Act 1627. His public anti-Catholicism brought him short-lived favour with the king.

Despite this early period of goodwill with King James I, his approach to public life, based on his immersion in the study of old documents, was essentially based on that "sacred obligation of the king to put his trust in parliaments" which in 1628 was expressed in his monograph The Dangers wherein the Kingdom now Standeth, and the Remedye.

From the Court party's point of view, this was anti-royalist in nature, and the king's ministers began to fear the uses being made of Cotton's library to support pro-parliamentarian arguments. Thus it was confiscated in 1630 and returned only after his death to his heirs.

== Role in Parliament ==
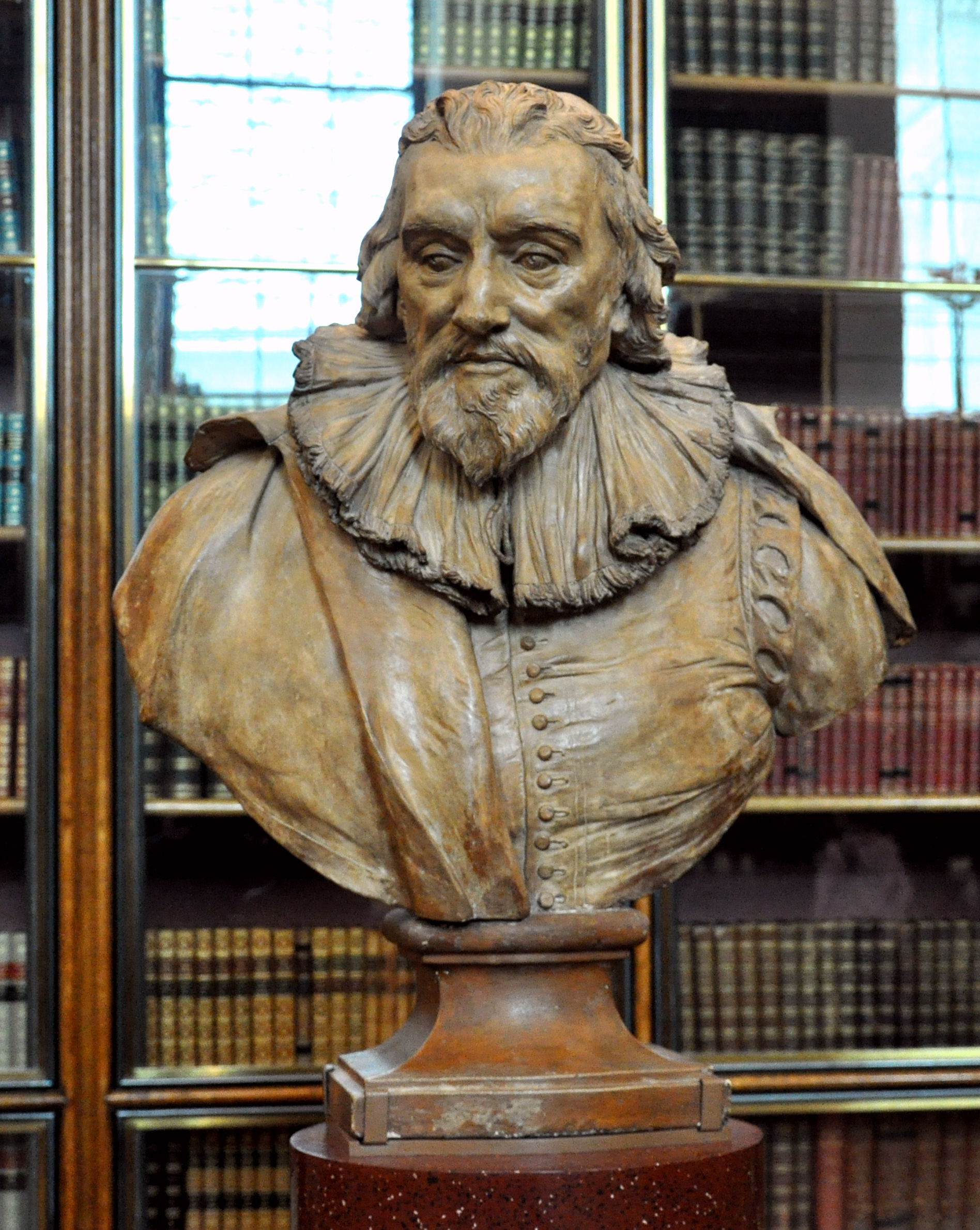
A bust of Cotton by Louis-François Roubiliac in the British Museum

Cotton supported the claim of King James VI of Scotland to succeed Queen Elizabeth I on the English throne, and after the queen's death was commissioned to write a work defending James's claim to the throne, for which he was rewarded with a knighthood in 1603.

Cotton was elected to Parliament for Huntingdonshire in 1604, a constituency previously represented by his grandfather, Thomas Cotton. Cotton worked on the Committee on Grievances and in 1605–06 received the Bill pertaining to the Gunpowder Plot through his work on the Committee of Privileges. In 1607 he was reappointed to the Committee of Privileges. Cotton was appointed to the joint conference with the House of Lords during his work on the bill pertaining to the full union between Scotland and England in 1606–07.

In 1610, Cotton was nominated in first place to the Committee of Privileges. In 1610/11 the royal revenues were low, and Cotton wrote Means for raising the king’s estate in which he suggested the formation of the baronetcy, a new order of social rank, higher than the knight but lower than the baron.

Cotton was not elected to the 1614 Parliament. In 1621, Cotton advised James I on the impeachment of Sir Francis Bacon concerning the respective roles of the king and Parliament. In 1624, Cotton was elected to represent Old Sarum after the previous member, Sir Arthur Ingram, decided to sit for York.

He was subsequently elected to Parliament for Thetford (1625) and Castle Rising (1628).

== Society of Antiquaries ==
Cotton reunited with his former schoolmaster William Camden in the late 1580s as an early member of the Society of Antiquaries. Camden was one of the greatest early antiquarians, whose 1586 work Britannia was a chorographical (topographical and historical) survey of Britain.

Cotton exerted little influence in the society until after his father's death in 1592. In 1593, he was resident at the family seat of Conington Castle, which he rebuilt. He returned to London in 1598 and revived the Society and petitioned for a permanent academy for antiquarian studies, suggesting that Cotton's collection of manuscripts be combined with the Queen's library to form a national library. The plan did not receive royal approval.

The discussion of the Society in the summer of 1600 focused on ancient burial customs, probably the result of a recent visit to Hadrian's Wall by Camden and Cotton during which they collected Roman coins, monuments and fossils. The trip appears to have initiated Cotton's interest in Roman artefacts. The antiquarians Reginald Bainbridge and Lord William Howard offered Cotton Roman stones while the Essex antiquarian John Barkham arranged to send him Roman relics.

Cotton's antiquarian studies influenced many people of his time and he was often sought after by other antiquarians for ideas. Below is a letter written by fellow antiquarian Roger Dodsworth to Cotton:

Honble- Sr

With my due acknowledgement of your multiplied favours presupposed, I thought good to advertise you that, since I saw you, I have used such meanes, as my health would permitt, to enquire after such things as you desired. I have beene att Cattericke wher I was informed of 2Romaine monuments weh were found in a 1620 and are now in my Io: of Arundells keeping. I have found, a peece of a round piller, att Ribblccester, being almost half a yeard thick, and half an ell in height, with such letters, on the one side thereof, as I have figured in this paper inclosed. I saw, ther, a little table of free stone, not half a yeard square, with the portraitures of 3 armed men cutt therin, but no inscription att all theron. I saw likewise 2 other stones of the nature of slate, or thicke flaggs some yeard square, with fretted antique workes engraven on them, without any letters. I shalbe very gladd that my uttmost endeavours, might availe to requite the least of many respects you have done unto me. And do desire you to signify your pleasure, what you would have mee to doo touching the premisses, and I shall not faile to do my best in effecting thereof...
Yours faythfully

Roger Dodsworth

Hutton grange 16 February 1622.

The last recorded meeting of the Society of Antiquaries was in 1607. Cotton, however, continued collecting.

== Marriage and progeny ==
As a young man, Cotton may have contracted a (possibly irregular) marriage with Frideswide Faunt, daughter of William Faunt of Foston, Leicestershire, and sister of the Jesuit theologian Arthur Faunt. The marriage was recorded by William Burton, Frideswide's nephew, but is not mentioned in Cotton's own papers.

In about 1593 (the precise date is not known), he married Elizabeth Brocas, the daughter of William Brocas of Theddingworth in Leicestershire. This marriage took place about a year after the death of Cotton's father, and helped to shore up his financial position, as Elizabeth was an heiress. Their subsequent marital history suggests that perhaps these factors outweighed personal compatibility.

By Elizabeth, Cotton had a son: Sir Thomas Cotton, 2nd Baronet (1594–1662). Sir Thomas in turn married Margaret Howard, by whom he had a son, Sir John Cotton (born 1621).

Sir Robert had an extensive circle of friends and a considerable capacity to charm, which he displayed both before and after marrying. He spent several years, and possibly more than a decade, living with the widowed Lady Hunsdon, perhaps as her lover during an overt separation from his wife. Eventually, the Cottons patched things up. Nonetheless, a reputation as something of a playboy attached to Sir Robert until the end of his life.

== Library ==
The Cotton library was the richest private collection of manuscripts ever amassed. Of secular libraries, it outranked the Royal Library, the collections of the Inns of Court and the College of Arms. Cotton's collection included several rare and old texts, including the original codex bound manuscript of Beowulf, written around the year 1000; the Lindisfarne Gospels, written in the 7th or 8th century; and the Codex Alexandrinus, a 5th-century manuscript of the Greek Bible. Cotton's house near the Palace of Westminster became the meeting-place of the Society of Antiquaries of London and of all the eminent scholars of England. The library was eventually donated to the nation by Cotton's grandson and is now housed in the British Library.

The physical arrangement of Cotton's library continues to be reflected in citations to manuscripts formerly in his possession. His library was housed in a room 26 feet (7.9 m) long by six feet wide filled with bookpresses, each surmounted by the bust of a figure from classical antiquity. Counterclockwise, these were catalogued as Julius, Augustus, Cleopatra, Faustina, Tiberius, Caligula, Claudius, Nero, Galba, Otho, Vitellius, Vespasian, Titus, and Domitian. (Domitian had only one shelf, perhaps because it was over the door). Manuscripts are today designated by library, bookpress, and number: for example, the manuscript of Beowulf is designated Cotton Vitellius A.xv, and the manuscript of Pearl is Cotton Nero A.x.

== Role of family on the Cotton library ==
Sir Robert Cotton began developing the works and manuscripts into a collection for his library shortly after the birth of his son in 1594. From the period 1609 to 1614 the deaths of various people (including Lord Lumley, Earl of Salisbury, Prince Henry, William Dethick and Northampton) all contributed to Sir Robert Cotton's purchase of works for his library.

Sir Robert Cotton is understood to have had a residence in Chester:

[e]arly in the 17th century, this Priory, or so much of as remained, was occupied as a dwelling-house by Sir Robert Cotton, the antiquary... there, according to tradition, he had been visited by Ben Jonson

and also in London; his wife and son remained in the country.

During his father's absence Thomas Cotton studied to eventually receive his BA on 24 October 1616 from Broadgates Hall, Oxford — the same year that Sir Robert Cotton returned to his wife Elizabeth and family (a result of a hiccup with the law involving the death of earl of Somerset). At that point, Sir Thomas Cotton had taken the responsibilities of the home and the library into his own hands.

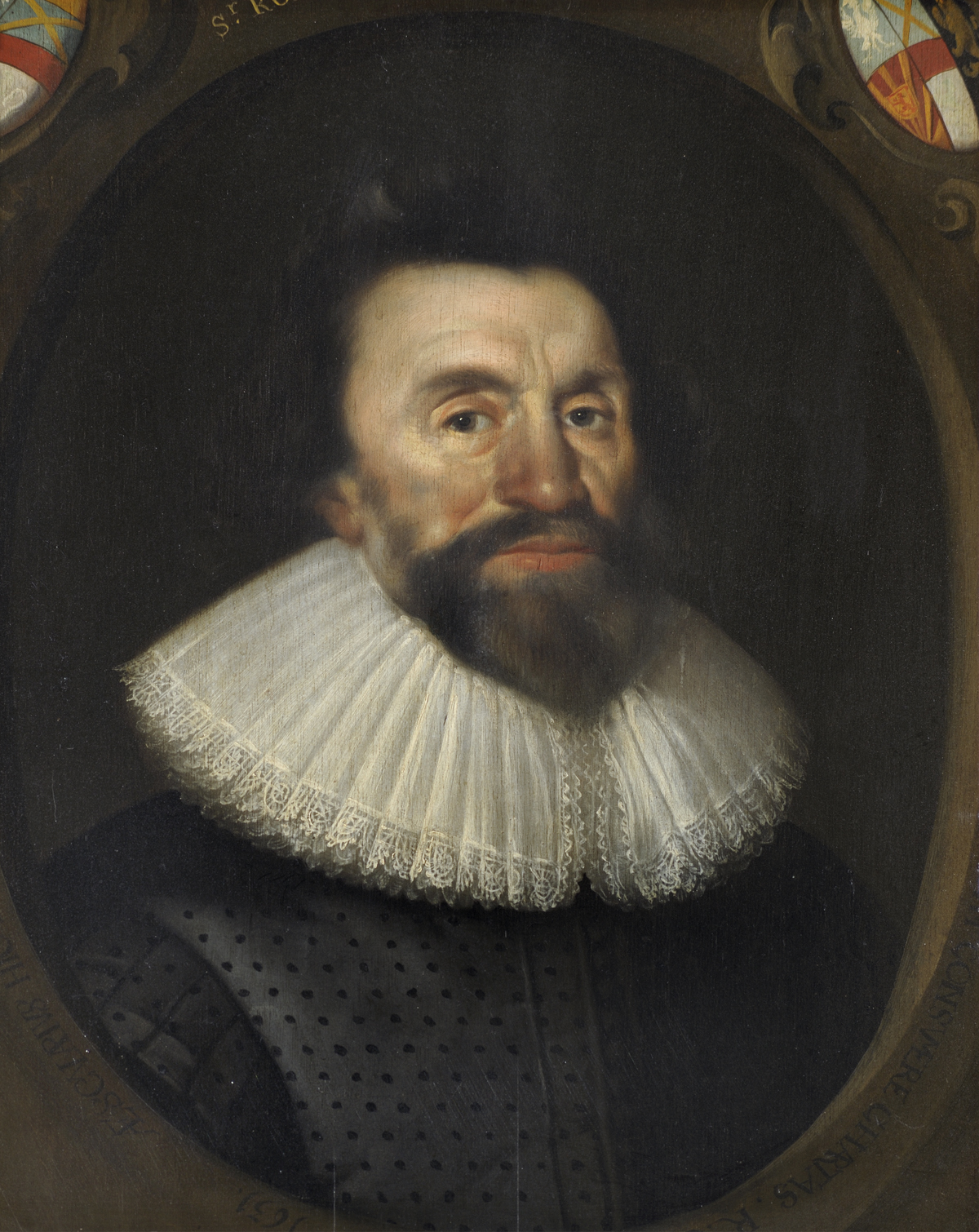
Robert Cotton in 1629, the year that he was forced to close the Cotton library by Charles I because the content within the library was believed to be harmful to the interests of the Royalists

In 1620, Thomas Cotton married Margaret Howard with whom he had his first son, Sir John Cotton, just one year later in 1621. Margaret Howard died in 1621-1622. In 1622 Thomas Cotton's father, Sir Robert Cotton, permanently moved residence to Cotton House, Westminster, along with the library which remained in Cotton House until Sir Robert Cotton's death in 1631. The relocation of the library and residence to Cotton House gave members of Parliament and government workers better access to the matter within the library to be used as resources for their work.

The Cotton library offered important and valuable sources of reference and knowledge to many people, such as John Selden, "a frequent borrower from the library, and probably its protector during the civil wars" as stated in the Oxford Dictionary of National Biography. Selden, in 1623 said of Cotton: “his kindness and willingness to make them [his collection of books and manuscripts] available to students of good literature and affairs of state". In keeping with the notion that John Selden was a common presence in the Cotton library, The British Library holds a list of thirteen works, and the locations of those volumes today, that had been lent to Seldon by Sir Robert Cotton.

After another hiccup with the government, Sir Robert Cotton was forced to close the library by Charles I because the content within the library was believed to be harmful to the interests of the Royalists in 1629. In September 1630 Sir Robert Cotton and Sir Thomas Cotton, together, petitioned for renewed access to their library. One year later, in 1631, Sir Robert Cotton died without knowing what the future held for his library, but wrote in his will that the library be left to his son Thomas Cotton and that it be passed down accordingly. After the death of his father, Sir Thomas Cotton married his second wife, Alice Constable, in 1640 with whom they had their son Robert Cotton in 1644. Sir Thomas Cotton's "ownership access to the Cotton library was more limited than under his father" according to the Oxford Dictionary of National Biography, and Thomas Cotton maintained his ability to "protect," "improve" and "maximize the profits" received during the civil war, as he had earlier on in his life as a result of his father's absence. Upon the death of Sir Robert Cotton on 13 May 1662, Sir Thomas Cotton obeyed the will of his father and passed down the library to his eldest son from his first marriage, Sir John Cotton.

On 12 September 1702, Sir John Cotton died. Prior to his death, Sir John Cotton had arranged for the Cotton library to be bought for the nation of England through acts of Parliament. The Library, which is considered one of the foundations of the British Museum, consisted of 958 manuscripts, one of the most prominent collections ever aggregated by an individual in British history. If the library had not been sold to the nation, despite the wish of his grandfather Sir Robert Cotton, the library would have been taken over and inherited by Sir John Cotton's two grandsons, who, unlike the rest of the college-educated Cotton family, had been illiterate and put the library at risk of getting broken up and sold to different divisions within the family.

=== Selected manuscripts ===
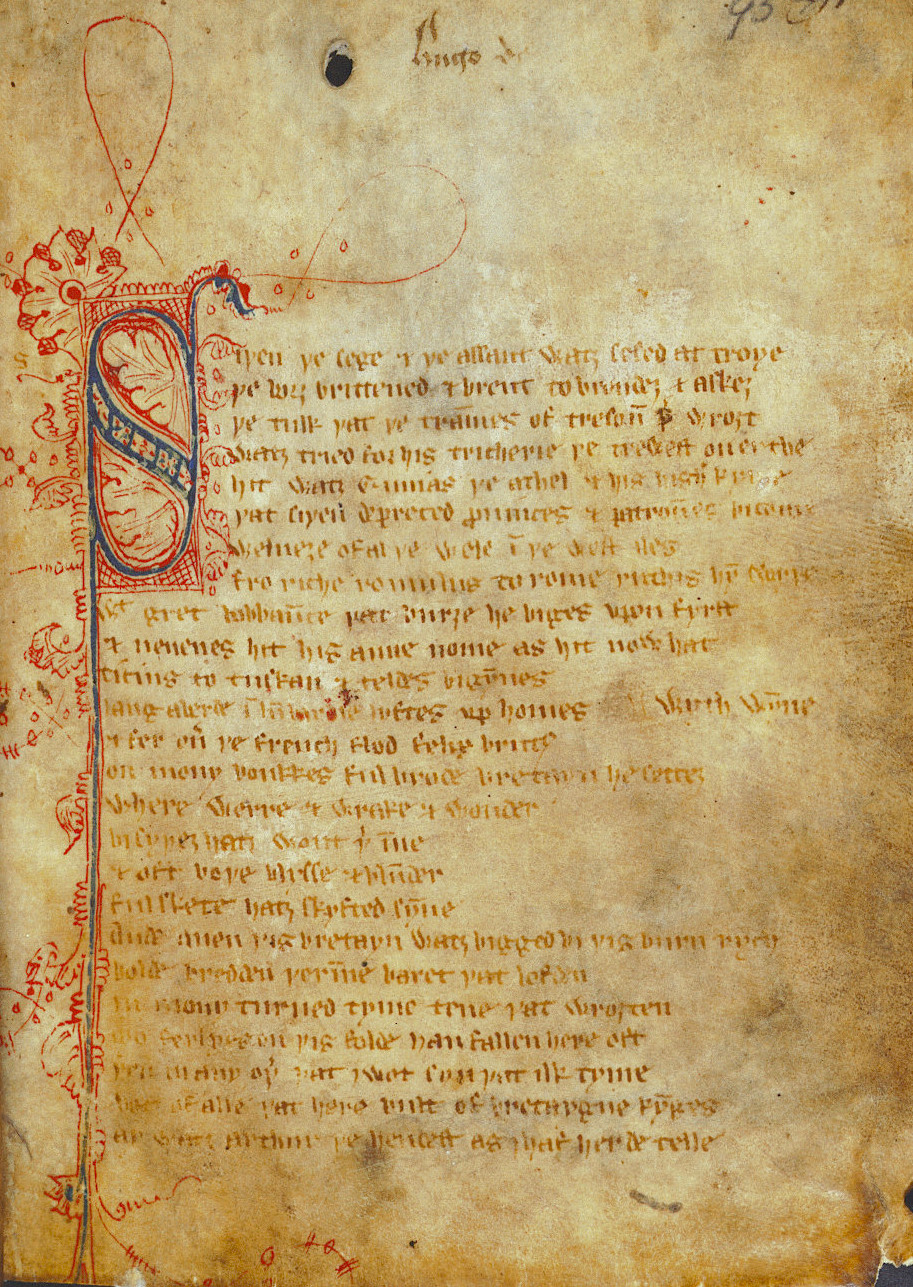
Cotton Nero A.x

- Cotton Julius A.x Old English Martyrology
- Cotton Augustus II.106 Magna Carta: Exemplification of 1215
- Cotton Cleopatra A.ii Life of St Modwenna
- Cotton Faustina A.x Additional Glosses to the Glossary in Ælfric's Grammar
- Cotton Tiberius B.v Labours of the Months
- Cotton Caligula A.ii "A Pistil of Susan" (frag.)
- Cotton Claudius B.iv Genesis
- Cotton Nero A.x. Pearl, Sir Gawain and the Green Knight
- Cotton Nero D.iv Lindisfarne Gospels
- Cotton Galba A.xviii Athelstan Psalter
- Cotton Otho C.i Ælfric's De creatore et creatura
- Cotton Vitellius A.xv Beowulf, Judith
- Cotton Vespasian D.xiv Ælfric's De duodecim abusivis
- Cotton Titus D.xxvi Ælfwine's Prayerbook
- Cotton Domitian A.viii Anglo-Saxon Chronicle (version E)

== See also ==
- Anglo-Saxon literature

Parliament of England
Preceded by Sylvanus Scory; Thomas Crompton	Member of Parliament for Newtown; 1601; With: Robert Wroth	Succeeded by Sir John Stanhope; William Meux
Preceded by Sir Gervase Clifton; Oliver Cromwell	Member of Parliament for Huntingdonshire; 1604–1611; With: Sir Oliver Cromwell	Succeeded by Sir Robert Payne; Sir Oliver Cromwell
Preceded by George Myne; Thomas Brett	Member of Parliament for Old Sarum; 1624; With: Michael Oldisworth	Succeeded by Sir John Stradling; Michael Oldisworth
Preceded by Framlingham Gawdy; Drue Drury	Member of Parliament for Thetford; 1625; With: Framlingham Gawdy	Succeeded by Framlingham Gawdy; Sir John Hobart, Bt
Preceded by Sir Hamon le Strange; Sir Thomas Bancroft	Member of Parliament for Castle Rising; 1628–1629; With: Sir Thomas Bancroft	Parliament suspended until 1640
Baronetage of England
New creation	Baronet (of Connington); 1611–1631	Succeeded by Thomas Cotton
