= Guybon =

Guybon may refer to:

- Thomas Guybon (c.1560–1605), English Member of Parliament for Castle Rising
- Guybon Goddard (1612–1671), English lawyer, Member of Parliament, and diaris
