= John Fielder (disambiguation) =

John Fielder was a nature photographer and writer.

John Fielder may also refer to:

- John Fielder (MP) in 1640 for Castle Rising, England

== See also ==
- John Fiedler, American actor
- John Feilder, English MP
- John Fielden, British industrialist and MP
