= James Hoste =

James Hoste may refer to:

- James Hoste (Castle Rising MP) (1633–1699)
- James Hoste (Bramber MP) (1705–1744)
