= List of returned long-overdue library books =

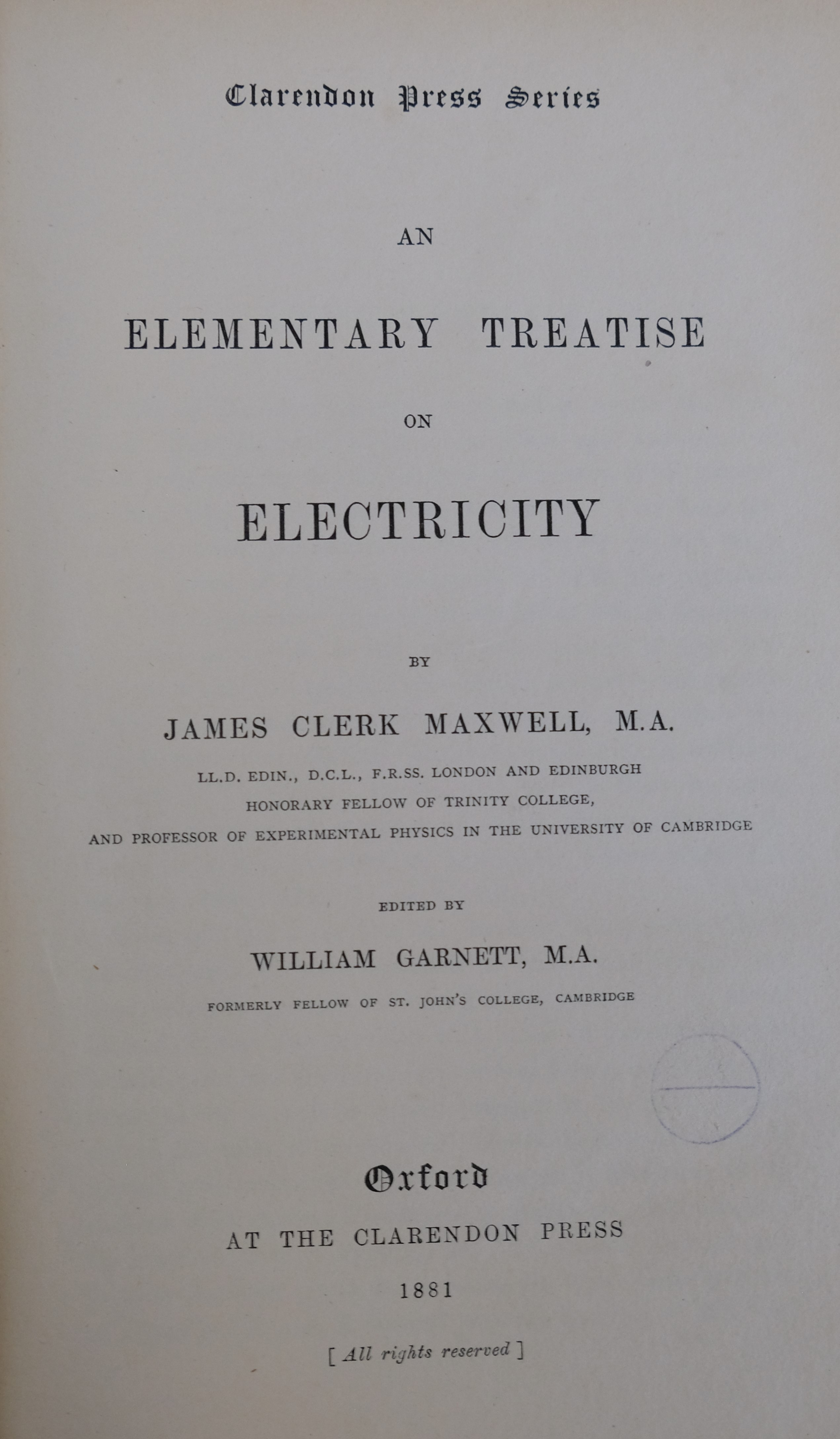
A copy of An Elementary Treatise on Electricity was returned after 119 years.

Many books have been borrowed from a library and only returned after decades or centuries. These are often found when people go through their deceased relatives' belongings. Some libraries have foregone overdue fees to encourage use of their services, possibly leading to more of these returns taking place. Some of these cases have been listed by publications such as Reader's Digest, and multiple examples have been listed by The New York Times.

As of January 2025, the Guinness World Record for "most overdue library book" is held by a 1609 German book about the Archbishop of Bremen, which was borrowed from Sidney Sussex College, Cambridge by Colonel Robert Walpole in 1667–68 and found by Professor John H. Plumb 288 years later in the library of the then Marquess of Cholmondeley at Houghton Hall, Norfolk. In most of these cases, late fees for the books are either waived, in amnesty, or already abolished by the time they are returned. However, as of January 2025 the world record for "largest library book fine paid" is held by the book Days and Deeds, which was returned after 47 years with a cheque worth $345.14.

== Australia ==
Title	Author(s)	Borrowed from	Date borrowed	Date returned	Years overdue	Notes
The Antiquities of Athens		Kiama Library	After 1872	July 2026	c. 150	The book had been the 506th item to be added to the library. Found in good condition but slightly weathered in a tea chest that had been bricked into a fireplace in Kiama, the book was returned to the same library from which it was borrowed, which had moved location from the Kiama School of Arts to Railway Parade. Late fees, no longer charged, were estimated at A$28,000 at a rate of three pence per week.
Insectivorous Plants	Charles Darwin	Camden Library	30 Jan 1889	June 2011	122	The first edition copy was in a man's private collection for around 50 years; he gave it to the University of Sydney Farms Library when he moved away, which eventually sent it back to Camden Library. Staff estimated late fees would be A$35,000, though the book did not attract a fine as it was the library's fine amnesty month. The book was put on display, not to be loaned again.
A History of Malvern		State Library Victoria	21 Apr 1955	June 2023	68	Graeme Coulson found the book when clearing his mother Helen Coulson's house in Echuca after she died age 103. It is unknown whether she borrowed the book from the library, though at least four books written by her are in the library's collection and she often visited it. The fine would have been A$11,929.44 with inflation. It went into the Rare Books collection as a book from before the closure of the State Library's lending library in 1971.

== Canada ==
Title	Author(s)	Borrowed from	Borrowed by	Date borrowed	Date returned	Years overdue	Notes
The Excellent Woman	Anne Pratt	Hamilton Public Library	Charlotte Morgan	1890s	Nov 2025	c. 135	The book was borrowed by Charlotte Morgan, a teacher at Central Public School in Hamilton, where it was found in the 1970s by Robert Moore's father behind a heat register as he was doing work at the school. Moore, a history teacher, found the book in his late father’s house and returned it to the library.
Camping and Woodcraft	Horace Kephart	University of British Columbia Library	Robert Murray (student)	10 May 1960	Jan 2025	64	Murray deliberately kept the book because "it was gold", but after a health scare he decided to return it, with a $100 cheque for overdue fees. The library eliminated most overdue fines in 2020.

== Finland ==
Title	Author(s)	Borrowed from	Date borrowed	Date due	Date returned	Years overdue	Notes
The Refugees (Finnish version)	Arthur Conan Doyle	Helsinki City Library	1939	26 Dec 1939	27 May 2024	84	The due date was one month after the beginning of the Soviet invasion of Finland; this was possibly why the due date was missed. In good condition, it was given to Helsinki Central Library Oodi once discovered.

== Ireland ==
Title	Author(s)	Borrowed from	Date borrowed	Date due	Date returned	Years overdue	Notes
The White Owl	Annie M. P. Smithson	Donegal County Library, Gweedore	23 Jul 1937	6 Aug 1937	17 May 2019	81	It was a first edition of the book, thought to be very rare. After being found during a house clearance in nearby Falcarragh, it was returned to Gweedore Public Library.
31st International Eucharistic Congress Pictorial Record		Navan Library	1932		27 May 2012	80	The book, published the same year as it was borrowed for 80 years, was slipped through the library's letterbox a month prior to the 50th International Eucharistic Congress. The fine was waived and it was put on display.
That Lady	Kate O'Brien	Clare County Council Library		11 Jul 1957	Jul–Aug 2019	62	It was returned to Stillorgan Library after being discovered in an attic. Late-return fees had been scrapped.
Down all the Days	Christy Brown	Aidan Heavey Library, Athlone		10 Sept 1971	14 Nov 2024	53	The book ended up in a flat in London before it was returned. There were no fines as they had been abolished in Ireland in 2019.

== The Netherlands ==
Title	Author(s)	Borrowed from	Date due	Date returned	Years overdue	Notes
Terug naar Oegstgeest	Jan Wolkers	Groesbeek Community Library	5 Mar 1981	Sept 2020	39	Overdue fees should have amounted to nearly €1,531.

== New Zealand ==
Title	Author(s)	Borrowed from	Date due	Date returned	Years overdue	Notes
Myths and Legends of Maoriland	A. W. Reed	Auckland Library	17 Dec 1948	April 2016	67	An anonymous woman had checked out the book as a child and said she had been meaning to return it. She was not charged as children were not charged late fees. The book was not thought to have any monetary value.
The Earl of Derby	George Saintsbury	Newtown Library			>50	It is unknown when the book was checked out or its due date; it was added to the library in 1902 and was likely missing "for a good 50 years". It was donated in a book sale in Northern Beaches, Australia, and was rebound by book binder Barbara Schmelzer before being sent to the library.

== United Kingdom ==
Title	Author(s)	Borrowed by	Borrowed from	Date borrowed	Date due	Date returned	Years overdue	Notes
German book about the Archbishop of Bremen		Robert Walpole (colonel)	Sidney Sussex College, Cambridge	1667–68		16 Jan 1956	287–288	The book was borrowed by Colonel Robert Walpole, the father of the first British prime minister. It was found by Professor John H. Plumb in the library of the then Marquess of Cholmondeley at Houghton Hall, Norfolk when he was working on a biography of Walpole. It holds the Guinness World Record for "most overdue library book."
The Microscope and its Revelations	William B Carpenter	Professor Arthur Boycott (student)	Hereford Cathedral School	c. 1886–1894		Dec 2016	122–130	Boycott was a former pupil of the school between 1886 and 1894; he went on to become a distinguished naturalist and pathologist. The book was discovered by his granddaughter Alice Gillett; the school waived fines, which at 17p per day would have been £7,446.
Poetry of Byron	Lord Byron	Leonard Ewbank (student)	St Bees School, Cumbria	25 Sept 1911		2024	113	St Bees student Ewbank later studied at The Queen's College, Oxford and was killed in the Battle of Ypres in 1916.
The Devil Held the Aces	Patrick Doncaster		Mile Cross library, Norwich	26 Sept 1949	10 Oct 1949	Jun 2026	76	The book was found in an attic. The original £800 fine at 1d per week was waived, though would have been limited to £5.60 under present library policy.
Stately Timber	Rupert Hughes		Dunfermline Central Library	23 Oct 1948	6 Nov 1948	Nov 2021	73	The book, only to be retained for 14 days, was delivered in a parcel to the library after being found by the borrower's daughter on the Black Isle. Potential fees came to £2,847, though Fife libraries had an amnesty on late fees during the COVID-19 pandemic.
Dogs and Their Management	Frederick Cousens		Darlington Library		8 Sept 1962	Feb 2026	63	The 1934 edition of a book originally from 1858 was given back by a customer who had cleared their loft. Fines were no longer charged but would have been 2 shillings and a sixpence.
The Adventures Of Pinocchio	Carlo Collodi		Rugby Library		31 Dec 1950	Feb 2014	63	It was returned during an eight-day fines amnesty. If this was not the case and the £5.22 were not in place, the fine would have been over £4,000 at 18p per day.
How to Lie with Statistics	Darrell Huff		Fenham Library		25 Nov 1958		62	The book was posted to Newcastle Central Library with a note reading "Better late than never!!" At the contemporary rate of 15p per day, the charge may have been around £3,434, but all fines were capped at £15. In-house publishing company Tyne Bridge offered the anonymous person some books as a thank you, if they came forward.
Cultures and Societies of Africa			Cambridge University Library			26 Sept 2019	59	The book was returned to Gonville and Caius College by a former student. The library waived the fine.
The Buried Stream	Geoffrey Faber		Middlesbrough Central Library		21 Dec 1962	Oct 2020	58	The poetry anthology was left in the library's returns box. The fine may have been £500 but charges have been suspended during the pandemic.
2001: A Space Odyssey	Arthur C. Clarke		Riddings Library		11 Oct 1969	Aug 2023	53	The book was dropped off at Scunthorpe Central Library, which opened five years after the book was borrowed. The person returning the book found it while clearing out a shop they had taken over, in a bag with three books of sheet music for Elizabethan love songs and blues numbers. Book fines had been scrapped across North Lincolnshire that July.
Indian Cookery	Mrs Balbir Singh		Paisley Central Library	1968		July 2021	53	It was posted to the library anonymously with a £20 note and an apology letter. The £20 was donated to charity. Marks on the pages suggest that the reader followed the recipes.
The Metaphysical Poets	Jim Hunter		Lowestoft Library		24 Sept 1967	May 2019	52	The borrower had taken the book while staying with their parents in the town and later found it while moving house. A note from the borrower said they were "extremely embarrassed". A £100 cheque was included to cover the fine, which went to the library.
Society for the Diffusion of Useful Knowledge atlas			Jerwood Library, Trinity Hall, Cambridge	Early 1970s		Nov 2021	>50	Its exact borrowing or due date was not known as there are no surviving records. It was returned after a college reunion; the fine would have been around £3,000, but the library had not charged overdue fines for three years.
Tomatoes for Everyone	Frank W. Allerton		Orkney Library		21 Jan 1974	6 Oct 2023	49	The manual on tomato culture had been in a box, moving from house to house before being returned in "good condition". A 1 pence per day fine would have amounted to £181.55. It was given a new plastic cover an put back out on the library's shelves.
Havelok The Warrior	Ian Serraillier		Hastings Library		14 Apr 1975	Feb–Mar 2023	48	It was returned during a seven-week books amnesty that lasted until March 2023.
A Confederate General from Big Sur	Richard Brautigan	Tony Spence	Tooting Library		19 Feb 1974	2022	48	The book was sent back by Spence, of Port Moody, British Columbia, Canada, who grew up in Bingley, Yorkshire. He found it in a box of magazines and said he "forgot" to put a note in when he sent it back. He was tracked down by the BBC after their appeal was seen by his wife on a Facebook group.
Learning With Colour Architecture: The Great Art of Building, and The Railway Series No. 22: Small Railway Engines	Trewin Copplestone, and Rev. W. Awdry	"Andy"	Basingstoke Discovery Centre		1972	Sep 2020	48	The two books, the latter being an early Thomas the Tank Engine book, were returned in a Royal Mail parcel. A note from "Andy" apologised for keeping the books when he moved as a child in 1972.
Canoe Building in Glass-Reinforced Plastic	Alan Byde		Orkney Library		15 Mar 1977	Jul 2024	47	The book was found during a house clearance.
The Sinister Sign Post	Franklin W. Dixon		Orkney Library		12 Jun 1976	Jul 2022	46	The book was found lying in an attic.
Tolkien's World	Randel Helms		Central Library, Blackpool		13 Mar 1978	Nov 2023	45	The borrower, an unnamed woman, had worked in a nearby branch of Woolworths in the 1970s and regularly visited the library on her lunch break to borrow stacks of books. She had missed this book, and apologised for it being "a bit late".
Music Notation	Gardner Read		Penzance Library		25 Mar 1980	Nov 2025	45	It was given back to St Ives Library during a book amnesty.
Great Prime Ministers	John Whittle		Manningtree Library		30 Jun 1979	Jan 2024	44	The book was brought in by relatives of its borrower. The late fee was waived.
The Golden Grove, or A Manual of Daily Prayers and Litanies	Jeremy Taylor		Royal Holloway, University of London library		Dec 1975	Apr 2019	43	The prayer book was returned alongside a letter including clues about who had borrowed it, which the library did not publish. The estimated late fine was about £6,278.
Edwin Muir	P. H. Butter		Orkney Library		24 Oct 1973	Jan 2017	43	It was found in a house clearance, in good condition.
The Cherrys and the Double Arrow	William Matthew Scott		Henleaze Library		5 Jan 1977	Nov 2019	42	The children's' book was left in a drop-box with a note and £10, saying it was found in the writer's parents' garage; it was "in a doubtful condition, discoloured and not that good".
To Sea in a Sieve	Peter Bull		Shetland Library		12 Jul 1973	7 Aug 2020	37	It was handed in to Bungay Community Library, 750 miles from where it was first borrowed.
Manners Make A Difference			St John Fisher Catholic High School, Peterborough		27 Feb 1989	Apr 2021	32	A note with the book said "Sorry! Just 32 years overdue! Call it Catholic guilt." The school's now-abolished 50p per day fine would have meant a total fine of over £800. It was put on display.
Bullies Don't Hurt	Anthony Masters	"M.M."	Salisbury Library		30 Jan 2003	Sep 2021	18	The book was sent back by post from Canada. An anonymous note read, "I deeply apologise for having stolen this book".

== United States ==
Title	Author(s)	Borrowed by	Borrowed from	Date borrowed	Date due	Date returned	Years overdue	Notes
The Law of Nations	Emer de Vattel	George Washington	New York Society Library	5 Oct 1789	2 Nov 1789	20 May 2010 (Note: Only a copy of the same edition of The Law of Nations was given to the library, not the original book.)	221	Washington borrowed the book when the library was sharing a building with the federal government. Staff discovered the book was missing in 2010 after conducting an inventory of books in the library's 1789-1792 ledger, which had itself been missing until 1934. Overdue fines would theoretically amount to $300,000. Staff at Washington's Mount Vernon home offered to replace the book with a copy of the same edition; this was done in a ceremony.
History of the War in the Peninsula and in the South of France	William Francis Patrick Napier	CS Gates (Union soldier)	Washington and Lee University Library	11 Jun 1864 (Note: The book was stolen, not borrowed.)		Apr 2009	145	The first of four volumes was stolen by Gates in a raid by General David Hunter and his army of West Virginia. Illinois handball coach Mike Dau, a descendant of Gates, returned the book. A potential $52,858 fine was waived.
An Elementary Treatise on Electricity	James Clerk Maxwell		New Bedford Free Public Library	14 Feb 1904 or 14 Feb 1905		Jul 2023	119	The book was donated in good condition to West Virginia University Libraries and its overdue status was discovered there. The late fee would have been $2,100, but had a maximum of $2.
New Chronicles of Rebecca	Kate Douglas Wiggin		Boise Public Library		Nov 1911	Oct–Nov 2021	110	The book was listed as missing in 1912. Though it is unknown where it was kept for over a century, the book was kept in "immaculate" condition. The library had scrapped late fees in 2019.
Ivanhoe	Walter Scott		Fort Collins Public Library	13 Feb 1919		2024	105	The well-annotated book was found in the possession of a woman who got it from her brother, who found it in their mother's belongings in Kansas. Under the fine of 2 cents per day, the fine when returned would be around $14,000 when adjusted for inflation. The library had stopped enforcing fines in 2020.
Famous Composers	Nathan Haskell Dole		Saint Paul Public Library	1919		Nov 2023	104	After the book was added to the library in 1914, it was checked out and was one of a third of its books to survive a fire the next year. The book had been returned to the library in 1916. After its later century-long loan it was deemed too delicate to return to circulation.
Shakespeare’s Life of King Henry the Fifth	William Shakespeare	Lillian L. Burns	Paterson Public Library		1 Feb 1923	Sept 2024	101	Denver resident Cyndy Delhaie found the book among those she had inherited from her grandmother Arlene Delhaie in 1995, and shipped it to the library. A projection of a fine based on contemporary fees of 10 cents per day was $3,686.50.
Forty Minutes Late	Francis Hopkinson Smith	Phoebe Johnson	San Francisco Public Library	1917		2017	100	Johnson died one week prior to its due date. Her great-grandson, Webb Johnson, discovered it in 1996 but kept it in fear of a fine. After missing three amnesties, he returned it as part of a pardon granted by the local library authority; a potential $3,650 fine was waived.
Facts I Ought to Know about the Government of My Country	William Henry Bartlett		New Bedford Library	2 May 1910		Dec 2009	99	It was returned by 75-year-old Stanley Dudek; he said it was likely loaned to his mother by the original borrower when she moved to the United States from Poland at age 14. She had died 10 years prior at age 89. The penny-a-day late fee would have been $360 but this was waived and the book was put in a special collection.
A History of the United States	Benson John Lossing	John McCormick	St Helena Public Library, Napa		21 Feb 1927	May 2023	96	Jim Perry found the book in his late wife Sandra Learned Perry's collection; the book was likely owned by her grandfather, John McCormick. Perry theoretically owed about $1,756 in fines at one nickel per day.
Youth and Two Other Stories	Joseph Conrad		Larchmont Public Library	11 Oct 1933		Oct 2023	90	A woman from Virginia found it in her stepfather's belongings and mailed it back to the library. The overdue fee could have been $6,400 at 20 cents per day, but was instead $5 as it had been considered lost after 30 days.
Your Child, His Family, and Friends	Frances Bruce Strain	Maria del Socorro Aldrete Flores (Cortez)	San Antonio Public Library	July 1943		June 2025	81	Cortez likely took the book to with her when she went to work at the US embassy in Mexico City. It was returned with a note that said the book had been inherited from their deceased father, and said "I hope there is no late fee for it because Grandma won't be able to pay for it anymore." The library stopped charging overdue fees in 2021, though it would have been at about $900 without inflation and about $16,000 with inflation.
The Bounty Trilogy	Charles Nordhoff, James Norman Hall		Aberdeen Timberland Library		30 Mar 1942	June 2023	81	Brad Bitar returned the copy; it had been sitting in his garage in Olympia, Washington. He said the borrower may have left the book behind while visiting his family's former store in Hoquiam, Washington. If fines accrued at the rate stated in the book, it would have cost $484.80, though the library stopped charging late fees in 2020. It was not put back in circulation.
The Picture of Dorian Gray	Oscar Wilde		Chicago Public Library	1934		Sep 2012	78	The daughter of the borrower returned the book during the library's first amnesty in 20 years. She had wanted to be sure that she wouldn't go to jail.
Stravinsky: An Autobiography	Igor Stravinsky		Woodstock Library	4 Apr 1952	18 Apr 1952	Dec 2024	72	Late fees had been removed in 2021.
Fire of Francis Xavier	Arthur R. McGratty		Fort Washington Library	10 Apr 1958	8 May 1958	4 Feb 2013	55	The book arrived in the mail with $100 check inside. Potential fines were estimated at $5,018.75 at 25 cents per day, though the maximum fine for the late book was its own cost.
Beowulf	Chauncey Brewster Tinker (translator)		Sewickley Public Library	January 1969		Dec 2023	54	The 5 cents per day fine from the time of its borrowing would have accumulated to $1,000, however this was limited to the book's cost of $0.98 as it was presumed missing. The library had since adopted a fine-free policy.
Ideal Marriage: Its Physiology and Technique	Theodoor Hendrik van de Velde		Mid-Manhattan Library	3 Aug 1959	17 Aug 1959	2013	54	The book was found in Arizona amongst the belongings of the finder's late brother-in-law from New York. It was returned with a note reading; "We found this book amongst my late brother-in-law's things. Funny thing is the book didn't support his efforts with his first (and only) marriage... it failed! No wonder he hid the book! So sorry!!"
Lombardi: Winning is the Only Thing	Jerry Kramer (editor)		Benson Memorial Library, Titusville, Pennsylvania		26 Jul 1973	Dec 2024	51	The original borrower returned the book. The library had not charged fines for overdue books since 2021, and placed the book on display.
The Early Work of Aubrey Beardsley	Aubrey Beardsley		Worcester Public Library	1973	22 May 1973	2024	51	Obtained by the library in July 1899, a Boston resident returned the book to Cambridge Public Library, which then sent it to Worcester Library. The late fee would have been $2000 if these fees had not been abolished by the library.
Goodbye, Mr. Chips	James Hilton		Unknown	Jul 1970		Dec 2021	51	The book was checked out in July 1970 from an address that is now associated with a shopping plaza, and returned to Flushing Library in Queens, New York City, after the city's library system ended late fees.
Baseball's Zaniest Stars	Howard Liss	Chuck Hildebrandt	Warren Public Library	1974	4 Dec 1974	4 Dec 2024	50	13-year-old Hildebrandt borrowed the book and years later decided to return it on the due date's 50th anniversary. He and the book had been erased from the library's system, and he was allowed to keep it. He attempted to raise an approximate equivalent of a fine, $4,564, for Reading Is Fundamental.
Leaves of Grass	Walt Whitman		Hopewell Regional Library	3 Jun 1974		22 Aug 2024	49	First obtained by the library in 1959, the book was returned almost 50 years later. It would have accumulated a late fee of about $1700 but these had since been dismissed by the library.
The Geller Papers	Charles Panati	Uri Geller (illusionist)	Los Angeles Public Library	Jan 1977	Jan 1977	Jun 2024	47	Geller himself checked out the book, about experiments performed on him by the CIA, to show it to a friend. He unknowingly brought it with him to several countries, ending up in Israel, and finally found it in a storage container. His daughter brought the book back to the library.
Days and Deeds		Emily Canellos-Simms	Kewanee Public Library		15 Apr 1955	13 Nov 2003	47	Canellos-Simms found the book in her mother's house, and gave the library a cheque of $345.14. This won the Guinness World Record for "largest library book fine paid".
