= Thomas Talbot =

Thomas Talbot may refer to:

== Politicians ==
- Thomas Talbot (MP for Lancashire) (died 1558), English politician
- Thomas Talbot (MP for Castle Rising), represented Castle Rising in 1640
- Thomas Talbot (MP for Thirsk), represented Thirsk (1659)
- Thomas Talbot (Upper Canada) (1771–1853), member of the Legislative Council of Upper Canada and settler of the Talbot Settlement
- Thomas Talbot (Newfoundland politician) (1818–1901), educator and politician in Newfoundland
- Thomas Talbot (Massachusetts politician) (1818–1885), governor of Massachusetts

== Others ==
- Thomas Talbot (died 1487) (c. 1439–1487), landowner and judge in Ireland
- Thomas Talbot, 2nd Viscount Lisle (1443–1470), English nobleman
- Thomas Talbot (antiquary) (fl. 1580), English antiquary
- Thomas Talbot (bishop) (1727–1795), Roman Catholic bishop
- Thomas Talbot (bottler) (1819–1891), beverage bottler of Gloucester
- Thomas W. Talbot (1849–1892), American machinist and trade unionist

== See also ==
- Thomas Talbott, philosopher
