= Sir Nicholas L'Estrange, 4th Baronet =

English Tory politician

Sir Nicholas L'Estrange, 4th Baronet (1661–1724), of Hunstanton, Norfolk, was an English Tory politician.

== Biography ==
L'Estrange was the eldest son of Sir Nicholas L'Estrange, 3rd Baronet and his first wife, Mary, daughter of John Coke. An orphan from the age of 8, he was raised first by his maternal grandfather and then by Sir Christopher Calthorpe, the later of whom imbued L'Estrange with his high Tory views. From 1667 to 1679 L’Estrange was educated at Christ Church, Oxford. In 1680 he was appointed a justice of the peace for Norfolk and the following year he was made a deputy lieutenant for the county. After the Earl of Shaftesbury planned an uprising against Charles II in 1682, L'Estrange was among those who signed the loyal address to the king. In 1683 he became the colonel of a Norfolk regiment of militia.

In 1685, he was returned to the Parliament of England as a Member of Parliament for Castle Rising. He served on one committee, on the bill for relieving imprisoned debtors. He gave negative replies on the repeal of the Test Act and Penal Laws, and was removed from the lieutenancy in February 1688. He did not stand for election again after the Glorious Revolution in 1688 and resigned all of his local offices, much to the annoyance of Henry Howard, 7th Duke of Norfolk. In 1696 he was put on trial for being a non-juror but was acquitted on a technicality.

He remained a non-juror and in 1721 his name was included on a list of likely Jacobites which was sent to the Old Pretender. He died on 18 December 1724 and was succeeded in his title by his son, Thomas, who had converted to Roman Catholicism. L'Estrange was described by Humphrey Prideaux as "a man of parts, virtue, and prudence. He is one of the worthiest gentlemen of the country".

Parliament of England
Preceded by Robert Howard; James Hoste	Member of Parliament for Castle Rising; 1685–1687; With: Thomas Howard	Succeeded by Robert Howard; Robert Walpole
Baronetage of England
Preceded by Nicholas L'Estrange	Baronet (of Hunstanton); 1669–1724	Succeeded by Thomas L'Estrange
