= Robert Howard (playwright) =

English playwright and politician

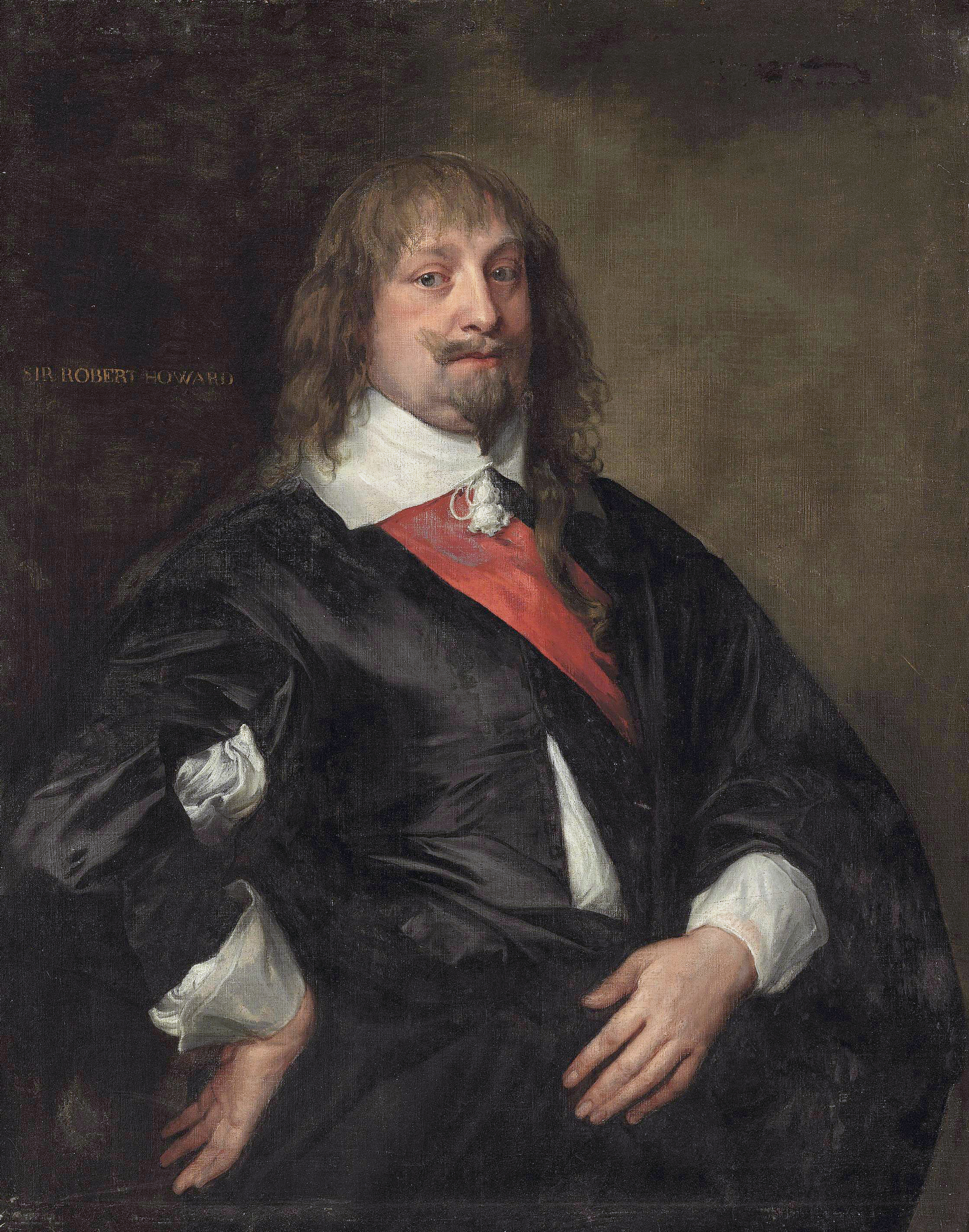
- Robert Howard by Anthony van Dyck

Secretary to the Treasury
- In office 1671–1673

Auditor of the Exchequer
- In office 1673–1698

Member of Parliament for Stockbridge
- In office 1661–1679

Member of Parliament for Castle Rising
- In office 1679–1685
- In office 1689–1698

Personal details
- Spouse(s): Anne Kingsmill; Lady Honoria O'Brien; Mary Uphill; Anabella Dives
- Children: Thomas Howard; Mary Howard, of the Holy Cross
- Parents: Thomas Howard, 1st Earl of Berkshire (father); Lady Elizabeth Cecil (mother)

Military service
- Battles/wars: Wars of the Three Kingdoms; Cropredy Bridge

Sir Robert Howard (January 1626 – 3 September 1698) was an English playwright and politician. He fought for the Royalist cause in the English Civil War.

== Life ==
Robert was born the fifth son of Thomas Howard, 1st Earl of Berkshire and his wife Lady Elizabeth Cecil, daughter of the 2nd Earl of Exeter. As the 18-year-old son of a Royalist family, he fought at the battle of Cropredy Bridge and was knighted for the bravery he showed there. In the years after the English Civil War his royalist sympathies led to his imprisonment at Windsor Castle in 1658.

After the Restoration, he quickly rose to prominence in political life, with several appointments to posts which brought him influence and money. He was Member of Parliament for Stockbridge in the Cavalier Parliament (1661 to 1679) and for Castle Rising (1679 to 1681 and 1689 to 1698), and believed in a balance of parliament and monarchy. All his life he continued in a series of powerful positions; in 1671 he became secretary to the Treasury, and in 1673 auditor of the Exchequer. He helped bring William of Orange to the throne and was made a privy councillor in 1689. His interest in financial matters continued, and in later life he subscribed to the newly founded Bank of England while continuing his work on currency reform.

Robert Howard is the first person known to use the English phase "We the People." He used this phrase in a debate in Parliament on 28 January 1689. He said, referring to King James II:

"When he acts by his Will, and not by the Laws, he is no King; for he acts by Power and Tyranny. I have heard, "that the King has his Crown by Divine Right," and we (the People) have Divine Right too; but he can forfeit, if he break that pact and covenant with his People, who have Right, by reason of their Election, as well as in the name of Mr King— This original of power, resistance or non-resistance, is judged by the power resolved by People and King— The Constitution of the Government is actually grounded upon pact and covenant with the People."(emphasis added)

He was thought of as arrogant and was caricatured in a play by Shadwell as Sir Positive-At-All, a boastful knight. Howard died on 3 September 1698 and is buried in Westminster Abbey.

== Works ==
Most of his writing was for the stage, although he also wrote some poetry, and two books on political questions. One of these was The Life and Reign of King Richard the Second, published anonymously in 1681, with the author described simply as 'a Person of Quality'. The book was published in octavo and contains 240 pages. In his Preface, Howard states that he 'has made it his business truly to set down naked matters of fact as he finds them related by the best authors, without obtruding his own fancies or dreams under the notion of history'. Howard was active in the London theatrical world after the Restoration, and was both scene designer for, and shareholder in, the Theatre Royal, along with Thomas Killigrew and eight actors. His plays were successful and continued to be performed in the 18th century, though some later critics, notably Walter Scott, found fault with them. The Committee; Or, The Faithful Irishman (1665), a political comedy, was the most popular. It caricatured the manners of the Commonwealth.

The Great Favourite, or The Duke of Lerma was preferred by some writers: A. W. Ward, for example. Howard and his brother-in-law, the poet John Dryden, co-wrote The Indian Queen, later set to music by Henry Purcell. Howard, who had acted as Dryden's patron for some time, went on to have a public dispute with him over the use of rhyme in drama, but they were reconciled before Howard's death.

Other poets' work paid tribute to Howard. John Dryden wrote a poem entitled, "To Sir My Honored Friend, Sir Robert Howard", in which Dryden praised Howard for his poetic abilities.

== Family ==
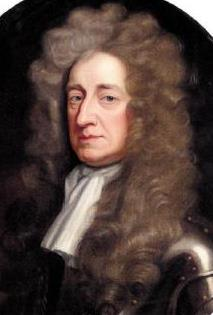
Sir Robert Howard

He married four times. After the mother of his six children, Anne Kingsmill, died, he married an older widow, Lady Honoria (née O'Brien), and adopted the manor at Wootton Bassett left her by her husband, Sir Francis Englefield. Lady Honoria complained to the King and to the Commons that Howard did not allow her any of the money which she had brought into the marriage. His third wife was Mary Uphill, who was often at Howard's manor house at Ashtead which he bought around 1680. In 1693 he married an 18-year-old maid of honour, Anabella Dives.

Thomas was his only surviving son; his daughter, the Poor Clare Mary Howard was in a convent at Rouen.

Howard was a great-grandson of Henry Howard, Earl of Surrey, who, jointly with his friend Sir Thomas Wyatt were known as the "Fathers of the English Sonnet" and were the first English poets to write in the sonnet form that Shakespeare later used. He had three brothers who also wrote plays — Edward Howard, Colonel Henry Howard, and James Howard. Their sister, Elizabeth Howard, was married to the influential English poet, literary critic, translator, and playwright John Dryden.

== Notes ==
Political offices
Preceded by Sir George Downing, Bt	Secretary to the Treasury; 1671–1673	Succeeded by Charles Bertie
Preceded by Sir Robert Long, Bt	Auditor of the Exchequer; 1673–1698	Succeeded by Christopher Montagu
Parliament of England
Preceded by Francis Rivett; Sir John Evelyn	Member of Parliament for Stockbridge; 1661–1679; With: Robert Phelips	Succeeded by Henry Whithead; Oliver St John
Preceded by Samuel Pepys; John Trevor	Member of Parliament for Castle Rising; 1679–1685; With: James Hoste	Succeeded by Sir Nicholas L'Estrange; Thomas Howard
Preceded by Sir Nicholas L'Estrange; Thomas Howard	Member of Parliament for Castle Rising; 1689–1698; With: Robert Walpole	Succeeded by Thomas Howard; Robert Walpole
