= Nicholas Harman =

Nicholas Harman was a Member of the Parliament of England for Castle Rising in April 1640.
