= Robert Cecil (1670–1716) =

English politician

Robert Cecil (1670 – 23 February 1716), of St. Anne's, Westminster and King's Walden, Hertfordshire, was an English Whig politician who sat in the English and British House of Commons between 1701 and 1710,

Arms

Cecil was baptized on 6 November 1670, the second son of James Cecil, 3rd Earl of Salisbury and his wife Lady Margaret Manners, daughter of John Manners, 8th Earl of Rutland. He married by licence dated 28 July 1690, Elizabeth Hale, for whom he had once fought a duel and been wounded. She was the widow of Richard Hale of King's Walden, Hertfordshire, and daughter and heir of Isaac Meynell of Meynell Langley, Derbyshire.

Cecil stood unsuccessfully for Hertfordshire at the 1695 English general election on the Whig interest. He became a commissioner for taking subscriptions to land bank in 1696 and tried again for Hertfordshire unsuccessfully in 1697. He was returned as Member of Parliament for Castle Rising by the Howard family at a by-election on 30 April 1701 but did not stand at the subsequent second general election of 1701. He was appointed a commissioner for trade and plantations in 1702 at a salary of £1,000 p.a. He lost his place at the commission of trade in April 1707. At the 1708 British general election he was returned as MP for Wootton Basset on the interest of Henry St John. He was identified as a Whig, voting for the naturalization of the Palatines in 1709 and for the impeachment of Dr Sacheverell in 1710. He did not stand at the 1710 British general election.

Cecil was known as "fat Cecil" and was reported in 1704 as having been 30 stone. He suffered continually from ill-health and died on 23 February 1716. He left his estates to his widow Elizabeth, by whom he had three sons and two daughters including Charles, who became Bishop of Bangor, and Margaret, who married Sir Robert Brown Bt.

Parliament of England
Preceded by Thomas Howard; Robert Walpole	Member of Parliament for Castle Rising; 1701; With: Robert Walpole	Succeeded by The Earl of Ranelagh; Robert Walpole
Parliament of Great Britain
Preceded by Henry St John; Francis Popham	Member of Parliament for Wootton Bassett; 1708–1710; With: Francis Popham	Succeeded by Henry St John; Richard Goddard
