= Castle Rising (constituency) =

UK parliamentary constituency in England, 1558–1832

- Former borough constituency for the House of Commons

1558–1832
- Seats: Two

Castle Rising was a parliamentary borough in Norfolk, which elected two Members of Parliament (MPs) to the House of Commons from 1558 until it was abolished by the Great Reform Act 1832. Its famous members of Parliament included the future Prime Minister Robert Walpole and the diarist Samuel Pepys.

== History ==
The borough extended over four parishes - Castle Rising, Roydon, North Wootton and South Wootton, in rural Norfolk to the north-east of King's Lynn. Castle Rising had once been a market town and seaport, but long before the passing of the Reform Act 1832 had declined to little more than a village. In 1831, the population of the borough was 888, and contained 169 houses.

Castle Rising was a burgage borough, meaning that the right to vote was vested in the owners of particular properties ("burgage tenements"), and that consequently the absolute right to nominate both the MPs could be bought and sold. Although it was possible for the landowner to create multiple voters by giving a reliable nominee notional ownership of the tenements – as was done in many other burgage boroughs – in Castle Rising the number of voters was kept as low as possible, and contested elections were almost unknown.

The Lord of the manor invariably owned a majority of the burgage tenements, though other influential local families were generally allowed to select the second MP. In the seventeenth century the Duke of Norfolk was the dominant interest: it was the Norfolk interest which enabled Samuel Pepys to gain the seat in 1673. At the start of the 18th century, the borough belonged to the Walpole family, and Sir Robert Walpole (Britain's first Prime Minister) began his parliamentary career here. Later in the century the Walpoles still nominated one MP, and the Earl of Suffolk the other. By 1816 the patronage had passed to the Earl of Cholmondeley and Richard Howard.

Castle Rising was abolished as a constituency by the Reform Act 1832.

== Members of Parliament ==
=== 1558–1640 ===
Year	First member	Second member
1558	Sir John Radcliffe	Sir Nicholas L'Estrange
1559	Thomas Steyning	Sir Nicholas L'Estrange
1562–1563	Sir Nicholas L'Estrange	Francis Carew
1571	Sir Nicholas L'Estrange	George Dacres
1572	Nicholas Mynn	Edward Flowerdew, sick and replaced Jan 1581 by Sir William Drury
1584	Michael Stanhope	Richard Drake
1586	Philip Wodehouse	Thomas Norris
1588	Bartholomew Kemp	Richard Stubbe
1593	John Townshend	Henry Spelman
1597	Thomas Guybon	Henry Spelman
1601	John Peyton	Robert Townshend
1604–1611	Thomas Monson	Sir Robert Townshend
1614	Sir Robert Wynd	Thomas Binge
1621–1622	Robert Spiller	John Wilson
1624	Sir Robert Spiller	Sir Thomas Bancroft
1625	Sir Hamon le Strange	Sir Thomas Bancroft
1626	Sir Hamon le Strange	Sir Thomas Bancroft
1628	Sir Robert Cotton	Sir Thomas Bancroft
1629–1640	No parliaments summoned	

=== 1640–1832 ===
Year	First member	First party	Second member	Second party
April 1640	Nicholas Harman		Thomas Talbot	
November 1640	Sir Christopher Hatton	Royalist	Sir John Holland	Parliamentarian
1641	Sir Robert Hatton	Royalist	Sir John Holland	Parliamentarian
September 1642	Hatton disabled from sitting - seat vacant		Sir John Holland	Parliamentarian
1645	John Spelman		Sir John Holland	Parliamentarian
December 1648	Spelman and Holland excluded in Pride's Purge - both seats vacant			
1653	Castle Rising was unrepresented in the Barebones Parliament and the First and Second parliaments of the Protectorate			
January 1659	John Fielder		Guybon Goddard	
May 1659	Not represented in the restored Rump			
April 1660	John Spelman		Sir John Holland	Parliamentarian
1661	Sir Robert Paston		Robert Steward	
February 1673	Sir Robert Paston		Sir John Trevor	Tory
November 1673	Samuel Pepys	Tory	Sir John Trevor	Tory
1679	Sir Robert Howard	Whig	James Hoste	
1685	Sir Nicholas L'Estrange	Tory	Thomas Howard	
1689	Sir Robert Howard	Whig	Robert Walpole	Whig
1698	Thomas Howard	Whig	Robert Walpole	Whig
January 1701	Thomas Howard	Whig	Robert Walpole	Whig
April 1701	Robert Cecil		Robert Walpole	Whig
December 1701	The Earl of Ranelagh		Robert Walpole	Whig
February 1702	Marquess of Hartington	Whig	Robert Walpole	Whig
July 1702	Sir Thomas Littleton	Whig	Horatio Walpole, senior	Tory
May 1705	Sir Robert Clayton	Whig	Horatio Walpole, senior	Tory
November 1705	William Feilding		Horatio Walpole, senior	Tory
October 1710	William Feilding		Robert Walpole	Whig
December 1710	William Feilding		Horatio Walpole, senior	Tory
1713	William Feilding		Horatio Walpole, junior	Whig
1715	William Feilding		Lieutenant-General Charles Churchill	Whig
1724	The Earl of Mountrath		Lieutenant-General Charles Churchill	Whig
1734	Thomas Hanmer		Lieutenant-General Charles Churchill	Whig
1737	Viscount Andover		Lieutenant-General Charles Churchill	Whig
1745	Viscount Andover		Richard Rigby	Whig
1747	Robert Knight, 1st Baron Luxborough	Whig	Hon. Thomas Howard	
1754	Hon. Horace Walpole	Whig	Hon. Thomas Howard	
1757	Charles Boone		Hon. Thomas Howard	
1768	Thomas Whately	Whig	Jenison Shafto	
1771	Thomas Whately	Whig	Crisp Molineux	
1772	Lord Guernsey		Crisp Molineux	
1774	Alexander Wedderburn		Robert Mackreth	
1775	Hon. Charles Finch		Robert Mackreth	
1777	John Chetwynd Talbot		Robert Mackreth	
1782	Major Sir James Erskine		Robert Mackreth	
1784	Charles Boone		Walter Sneyd	
1790	Charles Boone		Henry Drummond	
1794	Charles Boone		Charles Bagot-Chester	
1796	Horatio Churchill		Charles Bagot-Chester	
1802	Peter Isaac Thellusson		Charles Bagot-Chester	
1806	Richard Sharp		Charles Bagot-Chester	
1807	Richard Sharp		Charles Bagot	
1808	Richard Sharp		Fulk Greville Howard	Tory
1812	Augustus Cavendish-Bradshaw	Tory	Fulk Greville Howard	Tory
1817	Earl of Rocksavage	Tory	Fulk Greville Howard	Tory
1822	Lord William Cholmondeley	Tory	Fulk Greville Howard	Tory
1832	Constituency abolished			
