= Thomas Howard (1651–1701) =

English politician (1651–1701)

Sir Thomas Howard (1651–1701) was the only surviving son of Sir Robert Howard of Ashtead, Surrey.

He served as a Teller of the Exchequer from 1689 until his death, a position that provided him with a house at Westminster. He was a Member of Parliament for Castle Rising from 1685 to 1689 and again from 1698 until his death, with his father having held the seat before him. During the intervening period, he sat for Bletchingley in the two periods between sitting for Castle Rising.

He married Lady Diana, daughter of Francis Newport, 1st Earl of Bradford, in 1683. Together, they had three sons and a daughter. Only one son survived him, but he died the year after Thomas, at the age of 14. His daughter Diana married (in 1703) Edward Ward, 8th Baron Dudley and 3rd Baron Ward, who died in 1704, leaving her pregnant with a posthumous son, who succeeded his father in the Dudley estates, but died in 1731 without issue.

Sir Thomas Howard's grave is located in Ashtead church and was designed by William Stanton.

Political offices
Preceded by Simon Clifford	Teller of the Receipt of the Exchequer; 1689–1701	Succeeded by Sir John Stanley, Bt
Parliament of England
Preceded by Robert Howard; James Hoste	Member of Parliament for Castle Rising; 1685–1689; With: Sir Nicholas L'Estrange	Succeeded by Robert Howard; Robert Walpole, Sr.
Preceded by Ambrose Browne; Sir Marmaduke Gresham	Member of Parliament for Bletchingley; 1689–1698; With: Jeffrey Amherst 1689–1690; Sir Robert Clayton 1690–1695; Maurice Thompson 1695–1698	Succeeded by Hugh Hare; Sir Robert Clayton
Preceded by Robert Howard; Robert Walpole, Sr.	Member of Parliament for Castle Rising; 1698–1701; With: Robert Walpole, Sr. 1698–1700; Robert Walpole, Jr. 1700–1701	Succeeded by Robert Walpole, Jr. Robert Cecil
