= Deborah Aylward =

American politician

Member of the New Hampshire House of Representatives from the Merrimack 5th district
- Incumbent
- Assumed office December 7, 2022
- Succeeded by: Thomas Ware (elect)

Personal details
- Party: Republican

Deborah Aylward is an American politician. She serves as a Republican member for the Merrimack 5th district of the New Hampshire House of Representatives.
