= Richard Stubbe =

16th-century English politicians

Richard Stubbe (died 1619), of Sedgeford, Norfolk, was an English politician.

He was a member (MP) of the parliament of England for Castle Rising in 1589.
