= Robert Walpole (colonel) =

English Whig politician and militia officer

Colonel Robert Walpole MP

Member of Parliament for Castle Rising
- In office January 1689 – 18 November 1700

Personal details
- Born: 18 November 1650 Norfolk, England
- Died: 18 November 1700 (aged 50)
- Party: Whig
- Spouse: Mary Burwell
- Children: 19, including Robert, Horatio, Elizabeth, Galfridus, and Dorothy
- Occupation: Politician and soldier

Colonel Robert Walpole (18 November 1650 – 18 November 1700) was an English Whig politician and militia officer who served as a member of parliament for the borough of Castle Rising from 1689 to 1700. He is best known for being the father of Robert Walpole, the first Prime Minister of Great Britain and after 1801 United Kingdom. Walpole is the ancestor of all the Barons Walpole and Earls of Orford, of all creations, and of the present Marquess of Cholmondeley, owner of Houghton Hall. He is also the Guinness World Records holder for having the world's longest overdue public library book.

== Origins ==
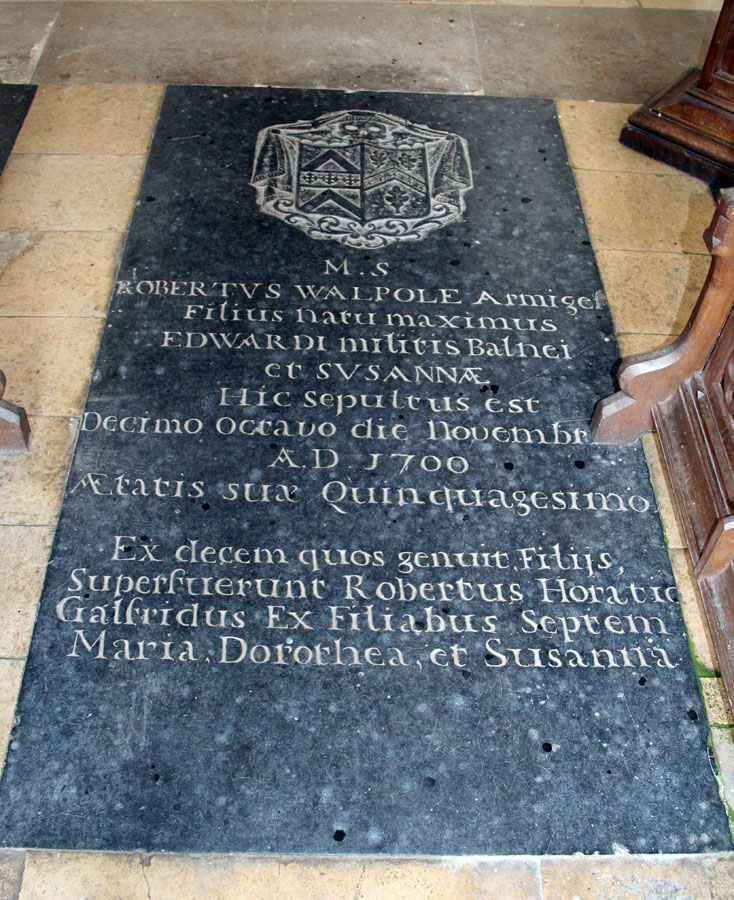
Ledger stone of Robert Walpole (1650–1700), Church of St Martin of Tours, Houghton, Norfolk. Showing arms of Walpole impaling Burwell

He was born at Houghton Hall in 1650, the son and heir of Edward Walpole (d.1668) of Houghton (the family seat for over four decades), by his wife Susan Crane. His father ardently supported the Restoration of the Monarchy to King Charles II and was subsequently created a Knight of the Bath.

== Political career ==
In January 1689, he was elected as a Member of Parliament for Castle Rising in Norfolk, and was considered the most influential Whig in Norfolk and one of the most influential Whigs in Parliament. He served as a Deputy Lieutenant for Norfolk when Henry Howard, 7th Duke of Norfolk was Lord Lieutenant of Norfolk.

== Marriage and issue ==
Arms of Burwell: Or, a chevron ermine between three bur (oak) leaves erect vert (Quercus macrocarpa, the bur oak, commonly spelled burr oak, is a species of oak tree native to eastern North America)

In 1671 he married Mary Burwell, daughter and heiress of Sir Geoffrey Burwell of Rougham in Suffolk, by whom he had nineteen children, of whom only nine survived, two being stillborn and eight dying in infancy:

=== Sons ===
- Edward Walpole (1674–1698)
- Burwell Walpole (1675–1690), killed at the Battle of Beachy Head
- Robert Walpole, 1st Earl of Orford (1676–1745), eldest surviving son and heir, who shortly after his father's death became a Member of Parliament and later held the offices of Secretary at War, Treasurer of the Navy, Paymaster of the Forces, First Lord of the Treasury, Chancellor of the Exchequer, Leader of the House of Commons, and became the first Prime Minister of Great Britain. He remained a Member of Parliament for forty years.
- John Walpole (1677–?)

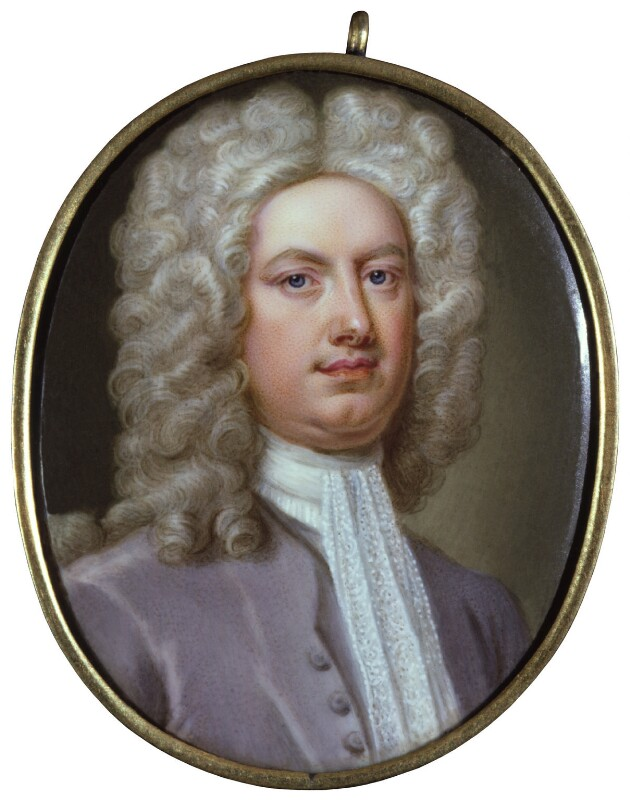
Horatio Walpole, 1st Baron Walpole

- Horatio Walpole, 1st Baron Walpole (1678–1757), one of the earliest holders of that first name in England, later much used by his family and by his illustrious cousin Admiral Horatio Nelson (1758–1805), his father's great-great grandson, born one year after 1st Baron Walpole's death. Horatio was a character in Shakespeare's 1599/1601 play Hamlet. He was a Member of Parliament for fifty-four years from 1702 until his death in 1757. During his political career he served as Secretary to the Treasury, Chief Secretary for Ireland, British Ambassador to France, Cofferer of the Household, Ambassador to the United Provinces and Teller of the Exchequer.
- Christopher Walpole, died as an infant
- Galfridus Walpole (1683–1726)
- Mordaunt Walpole (1688–1689)
- A stillborn boy (1690)
- Charles Walpole (1691–?)
- William Walpole (1693–?)

=== Daughters ===
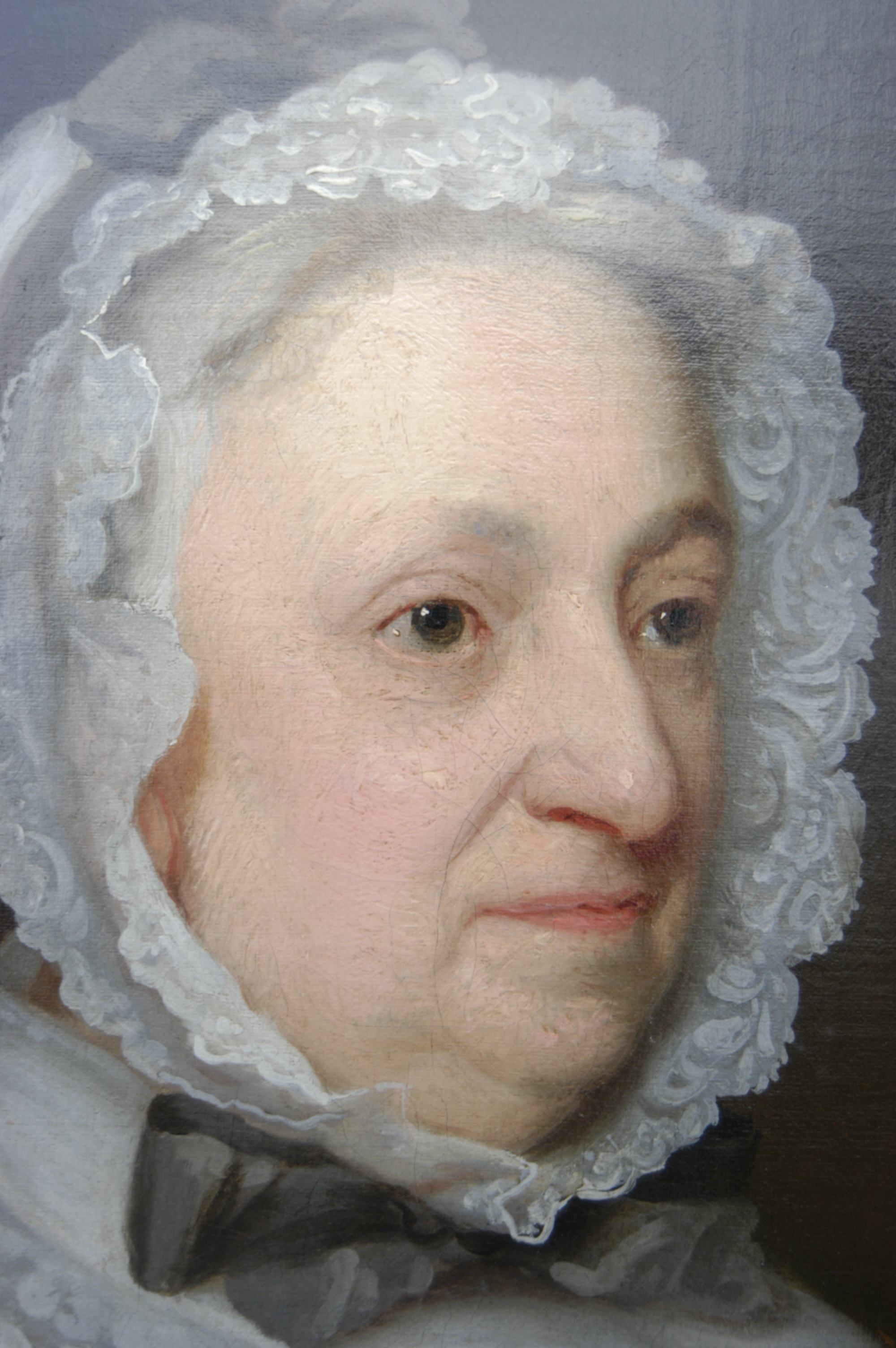
Susan Walpole, wife of Anthony Hamond (d. 1743). Detail from portrait attributed to Thomas Bardwell

- Susan Walpole (1672–?), wife of Anthony Hamond (d. 1743);
- Mary Walpole (1673–1701), who married Sir Charles Turner, 1st Baronet of Warham, Norfolk, a lawyer and Whig politician, and was the great-grandmother of the great Admiral Horatio Nelson (1758–1805);
- Elizabeth Walpole, died in infancy;
- Elizabeth Walpole (1682–1736)
- Anne Walpole (1685–?)
- Dorothy Walpole (1686 – 29 March 1728), who in about 1713 married Charles Townshend, 2nd Viscount Townshend (1674–1738), who in his childhood had been her father's ward, son and heir of Horatio Townshend, 1st Viscount Townshend (1630–1687), a grandson of Horatio de Vere, 1st Baron Vere of Tilbury (1565–1635), an English military leader (one of the earliest English holders of that first name);
- Susan Walpole (1687–?)
- A stillborn girl

== Overdue library book ==
In 1668 Walpole borrowed a German biography book about the Archbishop of Bremen from the library of Sidney Sussex College. It was finally found in 1956 when his descendant the 5th Marquess of Cholmondeley together with Professor John H. Plumb discovered the book in the library at Houghton. The book was quickly returned, 288 years after it was checked out.

== Notes ==
Parliament of England
Preceded by Sir Nicholas L'Estrange; Thomas Howard	Member of Parliament for Castle Rising; 1689–1700 with Sir Robert Howard 1689–1698; Thomas Howard 1698–1700	Succeeded by Robert Walpole; Thomas Howard
