= Orkney Library and Archive =

Public library in Orkney Islands, Scotland

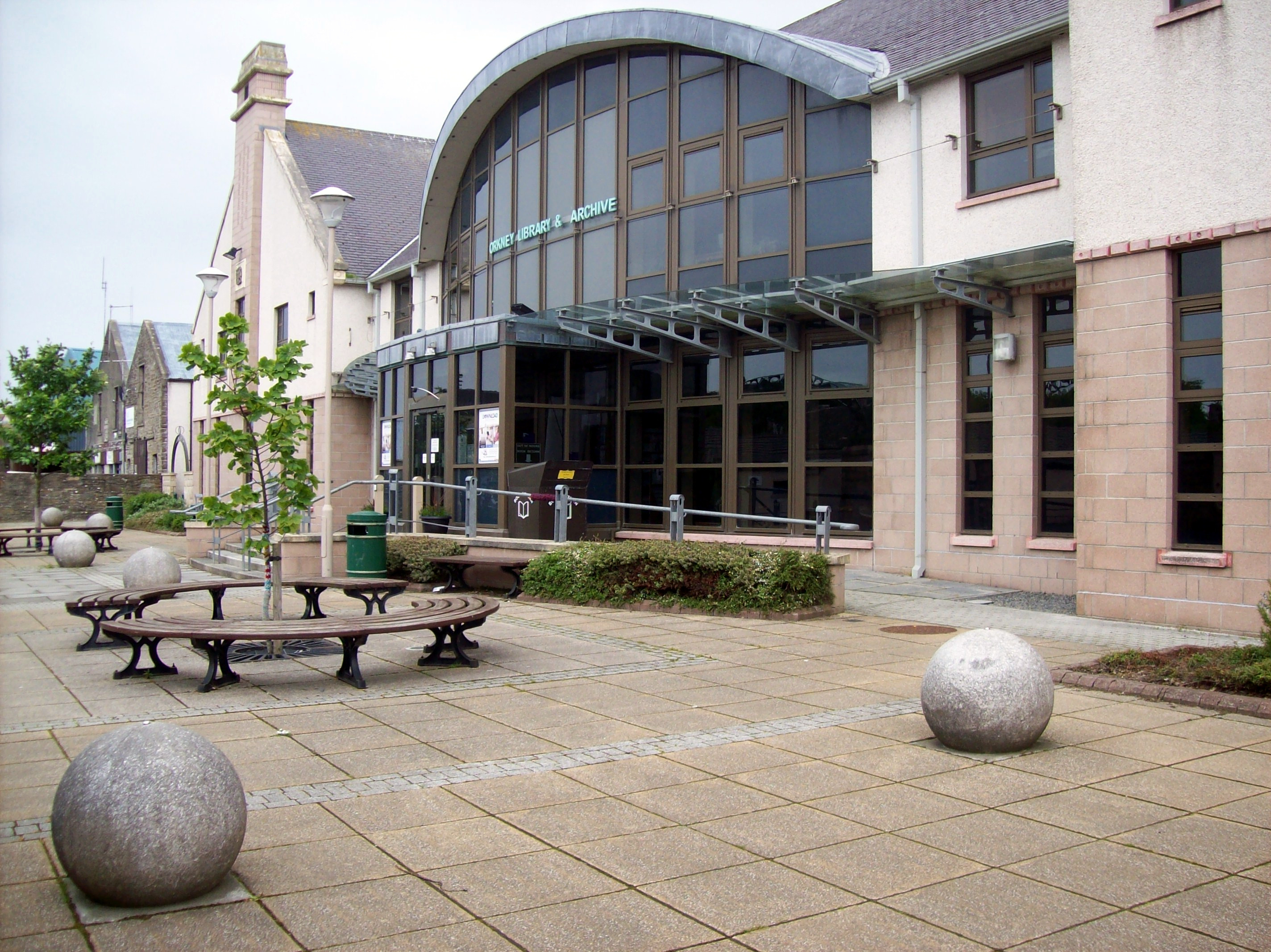
- 58°58′58″N 2°57′47″W
- Location: Kirkwall, Scotland, UK
- Established: 1683

Other information
- Website: http://www.orkneylibrary.org.uk/

Orkney Library and Archive is a Scottish public library service based in Kirkwall, Orkney. Founded in 1683, Orkney Library is the oldest public library in Scotland. Its rules date from 1815. It has become known for its popular, humorous Twitter account.

== History ==
The Orkney Library and Archive was founded in 1683 with a bequest of 150 books from William Baikie. The collection was kept at the local manse before being transferred to St Magnus Cathedral. In 1740 the collection was moved to the Old Tollboth. In 1815 a number of subscribers to the collection founded The Orkney Library. The library was a subscription-only service until 1890 when a donation from Andrew Carnegie allowed the library to adopt the 1850 Public Libraries Act. A further donation was made by Carnegie in 1903 for a dedicated building. The Carnegie Library on Laing Street was opened by Carnegie himself in 1909. It is no longer used as a library, but it is protected as a listed building.

The current library building on Junction Road, Kirkwall opened in August 2003.

In 2026 Orkney Library and Archive was chosen by Poet Laureate Simon Armitage as one of the venues for his annual library tour which in that year visited libraries in places with initials N-P.

== Archive ==
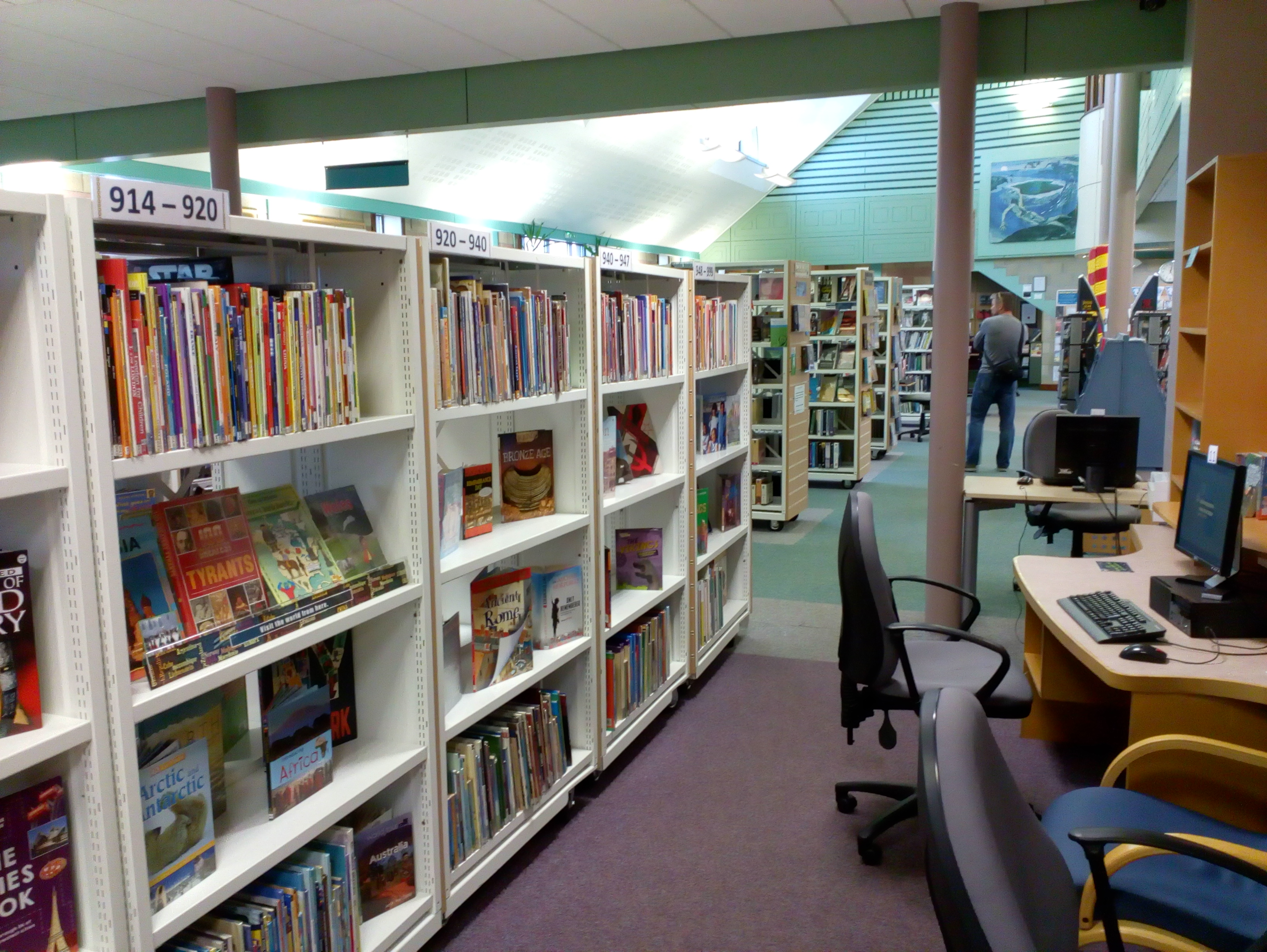
Library interior

The Archive was established in 1973. The collection includes local history and genealogical records, photographs, sound recordings, and film. The collection also includes letters from William Galloway to Sir Henry Dryden. The Archive service was awarded accreditation in November 2017.

== Services ==
The Library offers access to over 145,000 items, including fiction and non-fiction titles, audiobooks, maps, eBooks, music CDs and DVDs.

== Twitter presence ==
The Library enjoys a good-natured and well publicised Twitter feud with Shetland Library. J.K. Rowling paid a surprise trip to the library book group in 2016.
