= John Wilson (Castle Rising MP) =

English politician

John Wilson (fl. 1621) was an English politician.

He was a member (MP) of the parliament of England for Castle Rising in 1621.
