= John Fielder (MP) =

Former English Member of Parliament

Colonel John Fielder (fl. 1659), was an English Member of Parliament (MP).

Fielder was trustee and guardian of the children of the poet John Denham in 1650-54 in connection with the sequestration and recovery of Denham's estates.

He was a Member of the Parliament of England for Castle Rising in 1659.
