= Robert Townshend (MP) =

English politician

Robert Townshend (1580–1615), of Raynham, Norfolk, was an English politician.

He was the younger son of Sir Roger Townshend of Raynham and his second wife Jane (d. 1618), daughter of Sir Michael Stanhope. Sir John Townshend was his elder brother. On his father's death in 1590, he was what his father considered a sufficient amount to allow him to live as a gentleman, provided he was not extravagant. In 1593 he matriculated at New College, Oxford and in 1599 was admitted to Gray's Inn. In 1598 his mother married Henry, lord Berkeley.

Through his family's local connections Townshend was chosen as Member (MP) of the Parliament of England for Castle Rising in 1601, a seat that had been held by his brother in 1593. He was knighted at the Charterhouse on 11 May 1603. Soon after he purchased an estate in Wivenhoe, Essex, with money borrowed from his mother. In the parliament of 1604 he again sat for Castle Rising. He became embroiled in a legal dispute over his Wivenhoe estate and became seriously indebted, eventually selling the property to his mother. He died unmarried in 1617.
