= Cotton MS Vitellius A XV =

Cotton MS Vitellius A XV is the shelfmark of a composite manuscript now in the British Library in London. It is composed of two 11th–12th-century codices of Old English material bound together in the 17th century:

- Southwick Codex
- Nowell Codex
