= Thomas Guybon =

16th-century English politician

Thomas Guybon (c. 1560 – 23 January 1605), of King's Lynn, Norfolk, was an English Member of Parliament.

He was a member (MP) of the parliament of England for Castle Rising in 1597.
