= Thomas Ware =

American politician

Member-elect of the New Hampshire House of Representatives from the Merrimack 5th district
- Assuming office December 2026
- Succeeding: Deborah Aylward

Personal details
- Party: Democratic

Thomas Ware is an American politician. A member of the Democratic Party, he is the member-elect for the Merrimack 5th district of the New Hampshire House of Representatives.
