= Thomas Talbot (MP for Castle Rising) =

English politician

Thomas Talbot (fl. 1640), was an English Member of Parliament (MP).

He was a Member of the Parliament of England for Castle Rising in 1640.
