= John Peyton (died 1635) =

English politician

Sir John Peyton (1579–1635), of Wells, Norfolk, was an English politician. He was the son of Sir John Peyton (1544–1630), Governor of Jersey and Lieutenant of the Tower of London.

Peyton was a Member (MP) of the Parliament of England for Castle Rising in 1601. He wrote an extant account of his travels as a young man. A Relation of the State of Polonia is a manuscript work (Royal British Library MS 18 B I) produced between 1598 and 1603 on Polish affairs. In 2014 Sobecki identified the author as Peyton, and assigned the date of completion to 1603, the work being written for the coronation of James VI and I. Sobecki's identification is based on Peyton's letters about this work and the finding of a second copy (held at Univ. St. Andrews, MS 38902) of A Relation of the State of Polonia written in Peyton's hand and dated and signed by Peyton himself. Peyton was knighted in 1603.
