= Guybon Goddard =

English lawyer, MP and diarist (1612–1671)

Guybon Goddard (1612–1671), was an English lawyer, Member of Parliament, and diarist.

He was a Member of the Parliament of England for King's Lynn in 1654 and for Castle Rising in January 1659.
