= South Wootton =

Village in Norfolk, England

Coordinates: 52.77944°N 0.4426°E

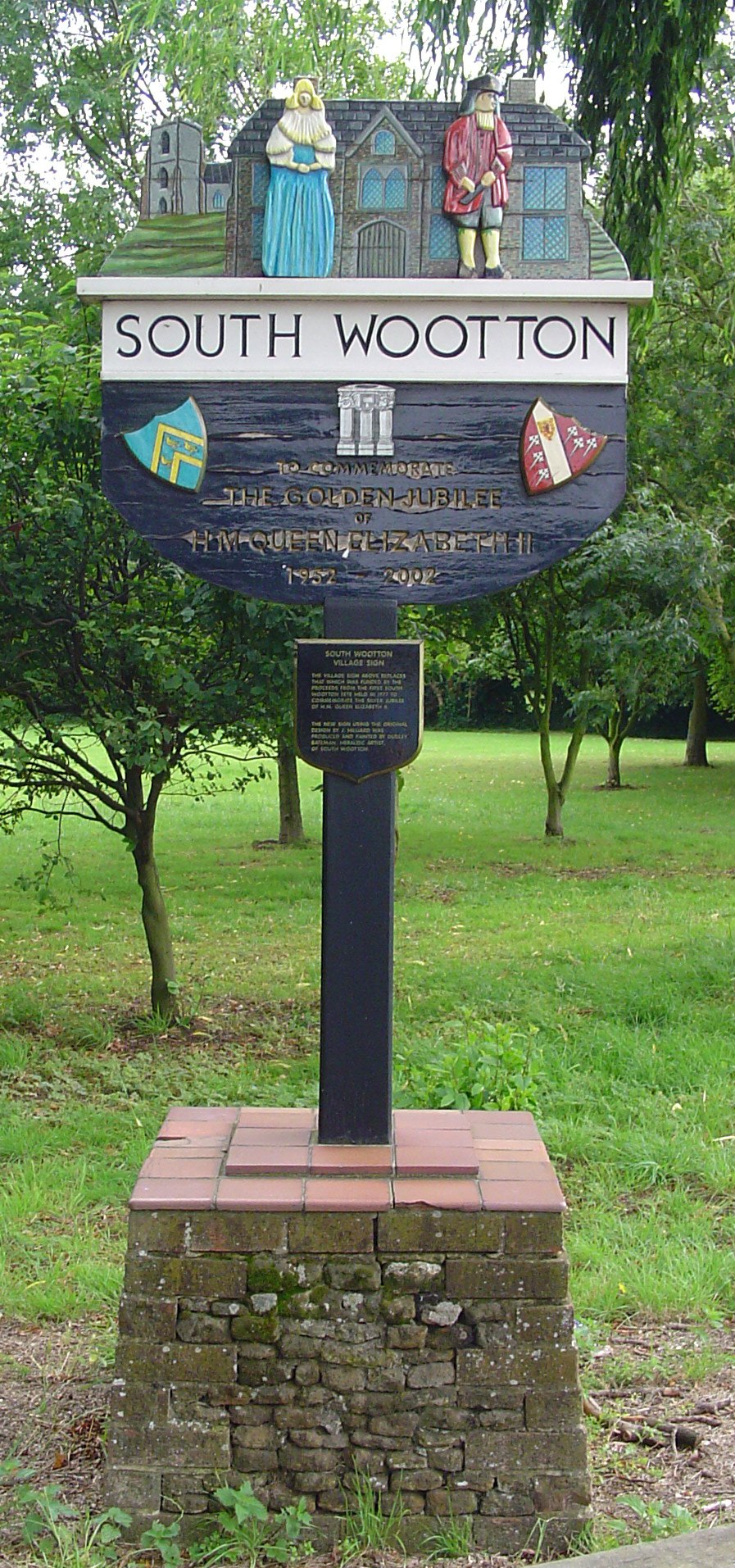
- Signpost in South Wootton

- Location within Norfolk
- Area: 8.54 km^{2} (3.30 sq mi)
- Population: 4,247 (2011)
  - Density: 497/km^{2} (1,290/sq mi)
- OS grid reference: TF648230
- Civil parish: South Wootton
- District: King's Lynn and West Norfolk
- Shire county: Norfolk
- Region: East
- Country: England
- Sovereign state: United Kingdom
- Post town: KING'S LYNN
- Postcode district: PE30
- Dialling code: 01553
- Police: Norfolk
- Fire: Norfolk
- Ambulance: East of England

South Wootton is a village and civil parish in the English county of Norfolk, approximately 2 miles (3.2 km) north-east of King's Lynn. It covers an area of 8.54 km^{2} (3.30 sq mi) and had a population of 3,717 in 1,450 households at the 2001 Census, increasing at the 2011 Census to a population of 4,247 in 1,696 households. For the purposes of local government, it falls within the District of King's Lynn and West Norfolk.

The older part of the village grew up around the village green and St. Mary's church, though there has been a fair amount of new housing built since the 1960s. There are two schools in South Wootton, South Wootton Infant School, followed by South Wootton Junior School.

The Parish Church of St. Mary the Virgin in South Wootton is led by the Rector, the Rev. Canon James Nash. It falls under the Parish of The Woottons and the Deanery of Lynn in the Diocese of Norwich.
