= Robert Wynde =

English politician

Sir Robert Wynde (c. 1580 – 1652), of Ashill, Norfolk and St. Martin-in-the-Fields, Westminster, was an English politician.

He was the son of Thomas Wynde of South Wootton, Norfolk. He became a courtier, serving as Sewer in ordinary by 1621 and a Gentleman of the privy chamber from 1628 to at least 1646.

He was a member (MP) of the parliament of England for Castle Rising in 1614.
