= Thomas Bancroft (MP) =

English politician

Thomas Bancroft (died before 1636), of Santon, Norfolk and St Faith under St Paul's, London, was an English politician.

He was a member (MP) of the parliament of England for Castle Rising in 1624, 1625, 1626 and 1628.

His wife was named Margaret and they had three daughters.
