= Thomas Byng (MP) =

English politician

Thomas Byng (fl. 1614), was an English politician.

Byng was a member (MP) of the parliament of England for Castle Rising in 1614.
