= James Hoste (Castle Rising MP) =

English politician

James Hoste (1633–1699), of Wood Hall, Sandringham, Norfolk, was an English politician.

He was a member (MP) of the parliament of England for Castle Rising in March 1679, October 1679 and 1681.
