= Old Hunstanton =

Village in Norfolk, England

Coordinates: 52°57′10″N 0°30′20″E

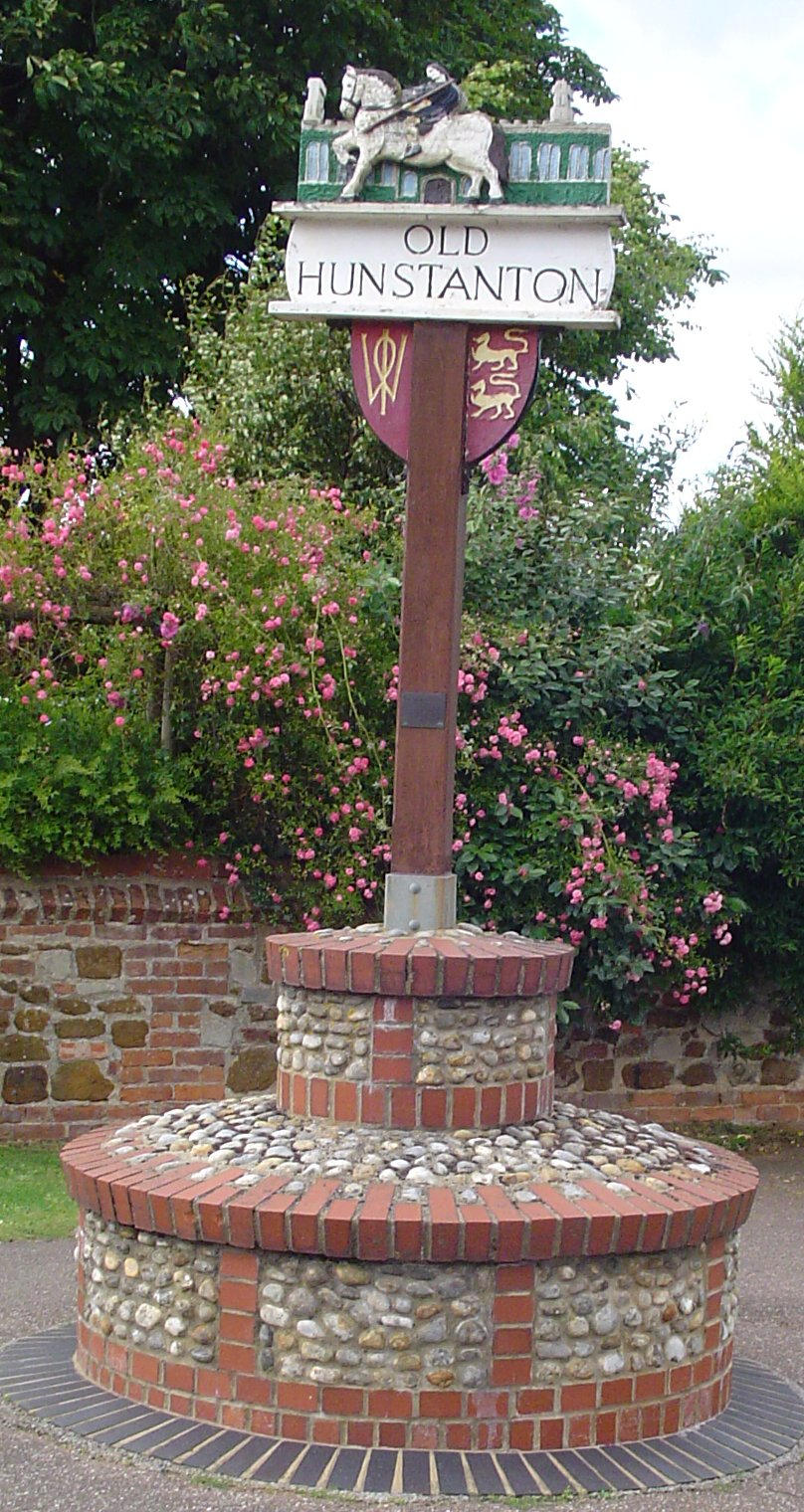
- Signpost in Old Hunstanton

- Location within Norfolk
- Population: 369 (Parish, 2021)
- OS grid reference: TF683422
- District: King's Lynn and West Norfolk
- Shire county: Norfolk
- Region: East
- Country: England
- Sovereign state: United Kingdom
- Post town: HUNSTANTON
- Postcode district: PE36
- Police: Norfolk
- Fire: Norfolk
- Ambulance: East of England

Old Hunstanton is a village and civil parish in the King's Lynn and West Norfolk district of Norfolk, England. Until the 19th century it was known simply as Hunstanton. The seaside resort town of Hunstanton, for a time known as New Hunstanton, was developed to the south-west of the village from the mid-19th century onwards, after which the older village to the north-east became known as Old Hunstanton. At the 2021 census, the parish of Old Hunstanton had a population of 369.

== Pronunciation ==
"Hunstan"; "Hunston" (the emphasis is placed upon the vowel of the first syllable). Professor Trudgill states that, twelve hundred years ago, Hunstanton was called hunstans-tūn, meaning 'the homestead of Hunstan', but that this three-syllable pronunciation "eventually and quite naturally acquired a more reduced form, Hunst'nt'n, which was later further reduced to Hunst'n", and that this happened a long time ago. He points out that the original form would "most certainly not come down to us as Hun-STAN-ton - that is a modern mistake". The "authentic old three-syllable pronunciation" is, he asserts, "HUN-st'n-t'n".

== Geographical and historical overview ==
This small settlement adjoins to the north the larger resort of Hunstanton or 'New Hunstanton'. The quiet character of Old Hunstanton remains distinct from and complements that of its busy sibling, with clifftop walks past the disused Old Hunstanton Lighthouse and the ruins of St Edmund's Chapel, built in 1272. King Edmund of East Anglia supposedly built the village. The River Hun runs to the coast just to the east of Old Hunstanton.

The parish church of St Mary, situated in the grounds of Hunstanton Hall, is a Grade I listed building. It was built by Sir Hamon le Strange in about 1300 and extensively rebuilt and restored during the 19th century by architect Frederick Preedy for Henry Le Strange (1815–1862), developer of New Hunstanton. In the parish, at the deserted medieval village of Barret Ringstead (or Ringstead Parva), is the ruined Chapel of St Andrew which is Grade II*.

St Mary's churchyard contains the graves of a customs officer William Green and William Webb of the 15th Light Dragoons, both of whom were fatally wounded during a skirmish on the Hunstanton coast with smugglers. The clash occurred on the night of 25 September 1784, also claiming the life of another customs officer named Rennett. However, although the alleged perpetrators were tried at Thetford the following year it proved impossible to secure any convictions. Both gravestones are Grade II listed; one has "Here be the mangled remains of poor William Green an Honest Officer of Government who/in the faithful discharge of his duty/was inhumanely murdered/by a gang of smugglers in this parish."

The Hunstanton Lifeboat Station at Old Hunstanton is a RNLI lifeboat station with a B class (Atlantic) boat and a hovercraft.

Parts of the beach are backed by sand dunes and are the location for beach huts.

Storms deposit items on the beach including marine life this may be strandings of cetaceans, mass strandings of starfish and shellfish or boats wrecked in storms. In December 2011 a large whale washed ashore on the beach.

== History ==
The village of Old Hunstanton is recorded in Domesday Book as ‘Hunestanestada’. Later it became part of the Le Strange family (or L'Estrange) estates.

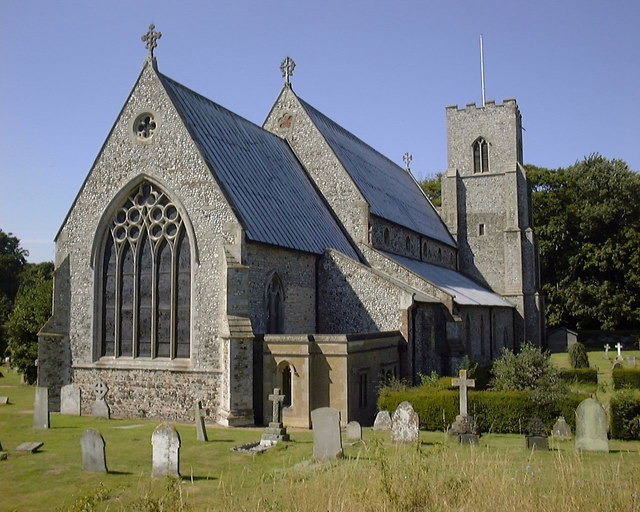
St Mary's Church

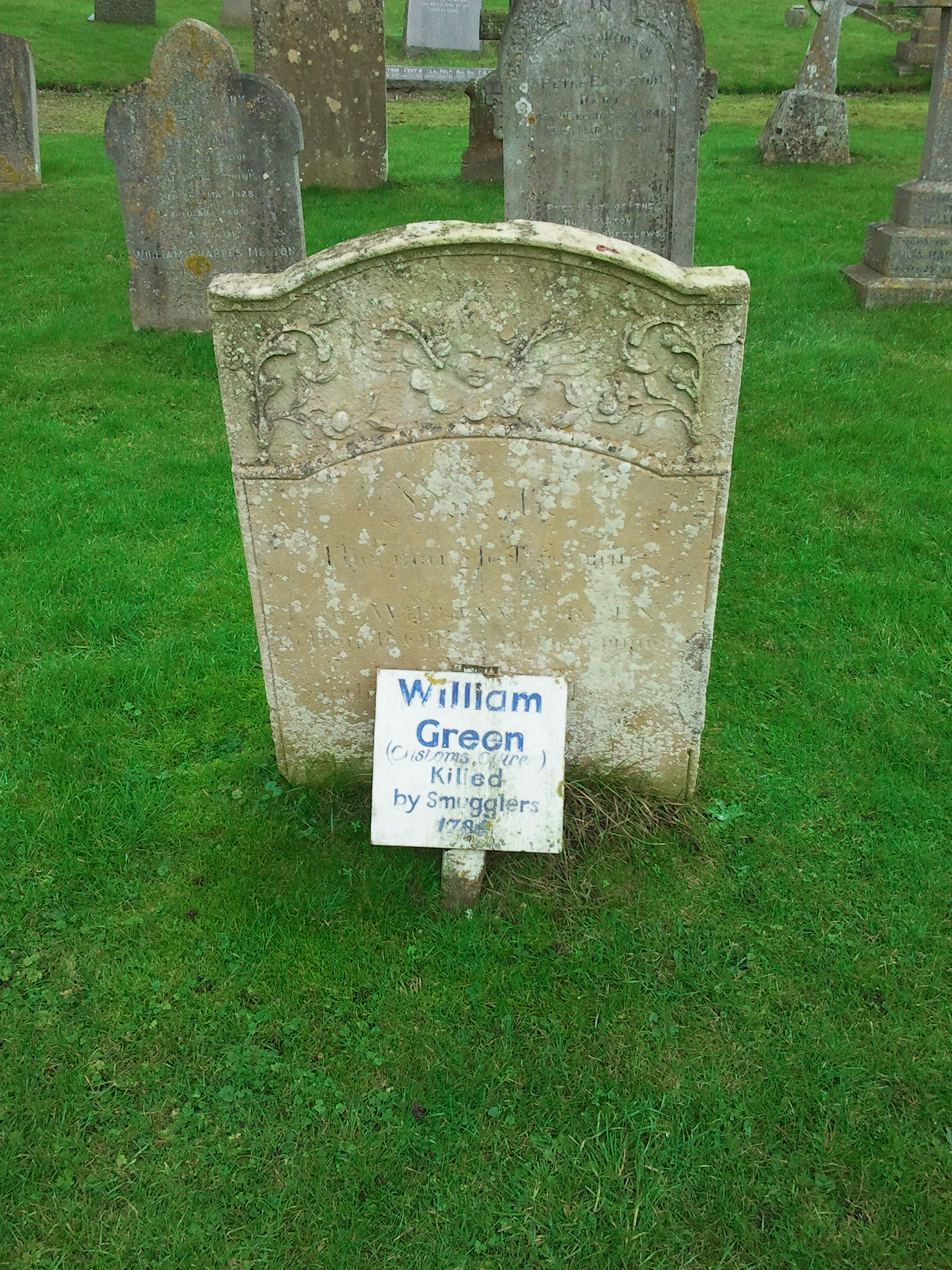
William Green's grave

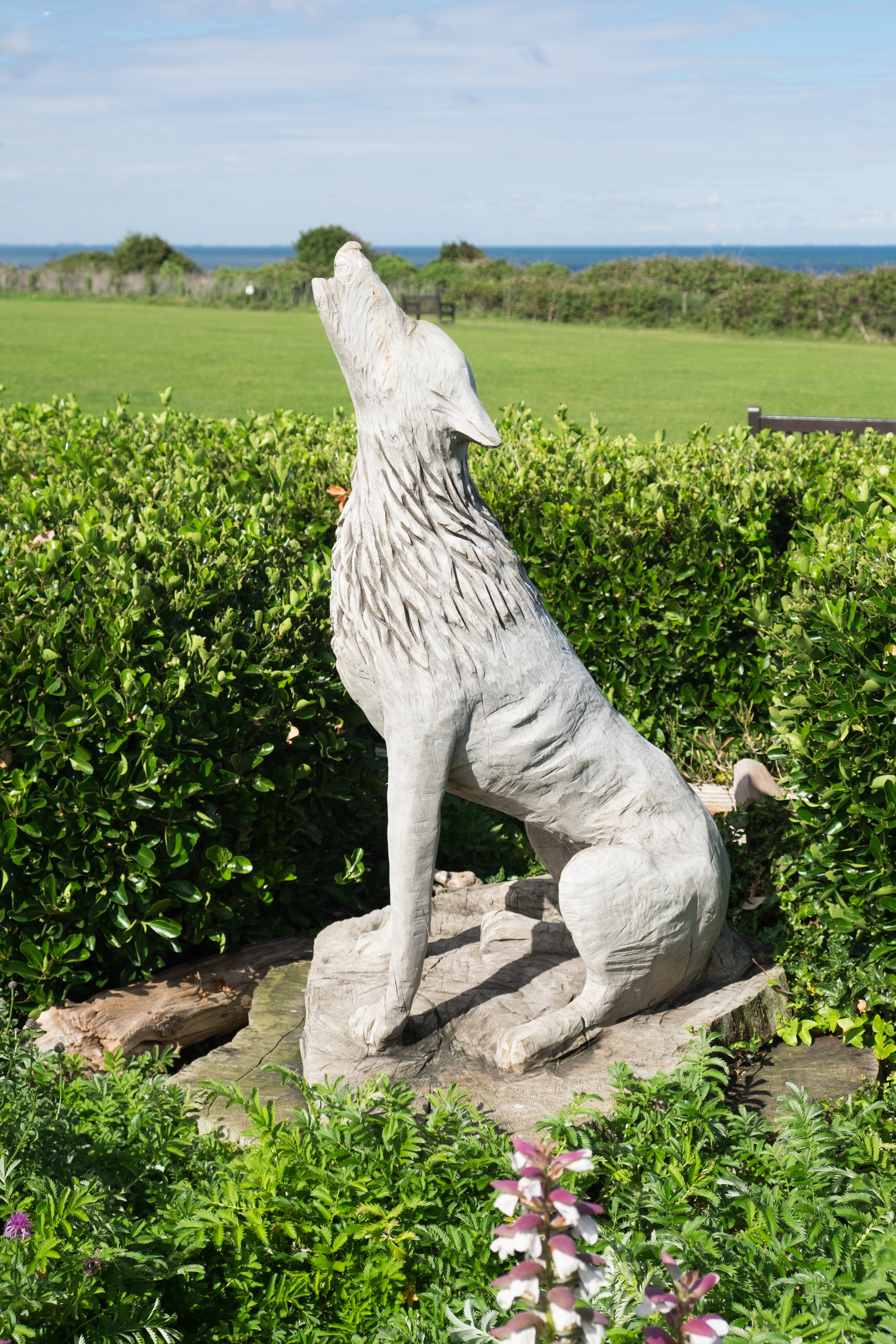
Wolf sculpture marking the spot overlooking where St Edmund supposedly landed in 855
