= Old Hunstanton Lighthouse =

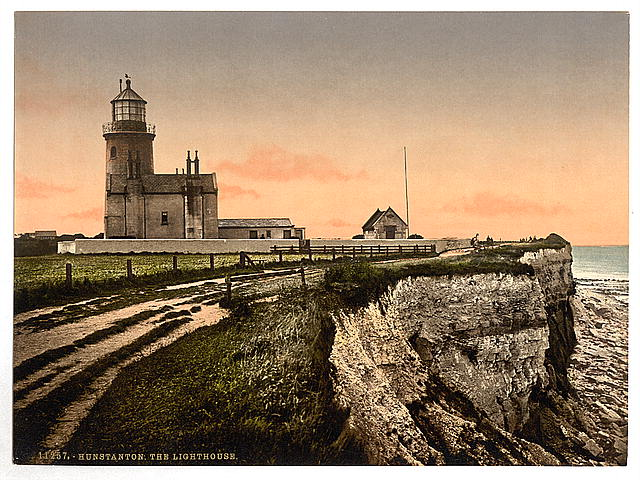
- Old Hunstanton Lighthouse
- Location: St Edmund’s Point; Norfolk; England
- OS grid: TF6763042048
- Coordinates: 52.949645°N 0.493760°E

Tower
- Constructed: c. 1665 (first); 1778 (second)
- Construction: masonry tower
- Height: 19 metres (62 ft)
- Shape: cylindrical tower with balcony attached to 2-storey keeper's house
- Markings: white tower
- Operator: The Old Lighthouse
- Heritage: Grade II listed building

Light
- First lit: 1840 (current)
- Deactivated: 1922

Listed Building – Grade II
- Official name: The Lighthouse
- Designated: 20 September 1984
- Reference no.: 1171495

Old Hunstanton Lighthouse is a former lighthouse located in Old Hunstanton in the English county of Norfolk, generally called Hunstanton Lighthouse during its operational life. It was built at the highest point available on this part of the coast, on top of Hunstanton Cliffs, and served to help guide vessels into the safe water of Lynn Deeps. Although the present lighthouse was built in 1840, there had been a lighthouse on the site since the 17th century (prior to which a light to aid navigation may have been displayed from St Edmund's Chapel, the ruins of which stand nearby). Prior to the establishment of the Lynn Well light vessel in 1828, Hunstanton Lighthouse provided the only visible guide to ships seeking to enter The Wash at night.

== History ==
Before the establishment of a lighthouse in the vicinity, it appears that sailors used the lights burning in St Edmund's Chapel to guide them into The Wash by night. The pair of lighthouses that later stood on the site were known as the 'Chapel Lights'; and in 1838 their successor was still referred to, by John Purdy, as 'the Chapel Light, on Hunstanton Point'.

=== The first lighthouses ===
In 1663 permission was sought by a consortium of the merchants and ship-owners of Boston and Lynn to erect one or more lights near St Edmund's Point, to help guide their vessels into The Wash. That November, a warrant was issued by Charles II to John Knight, permitting him to build a light or lights 'upon the Hunston-cliffe or chappel lands', and to maintain them by levying dues on passing ships. The first lights, a pair of stone towers which functioned as leading lights, were built by him in 1665, at a cost of over £200. The front light of the pair was candle-lit; the rear had a coal-fired brazier. They were found to be 'of great benefit'.

In 1710 it was reported that the lighthouses were 'decayed and want repairing and will admit of great alterations and improvements'. That same year Knight's niece Rebecca and her husband James Everard were granted the right to receive the light dues for the period of the next fifty years. Substantial repairs were undertaken.

By 1750 the front lighthouse, the smaller of the two, seems to have been taken out of commission. It seems that the structure remained standing for a time: but while two lighthouses are shown on John Cary's county map of 1787, there is only one on his map of 1794.

=== Everard's lighthouse of 1776 ===
In around 1776 the rear lighthouse was destroyed by a fire. It was replaced by a new wooden structure, commissioned by Edward Everard of Lynn (grandson of the above-mentioned Rebecca and John), who had inherited the patent rights: a circular tower 33 feet (10 m) high, tapering from 11 ft (3.4 m) to 8 ft (2.4 m) in diameter from bottom to top. It placed the light at 85 feet (26 m) above sea level. Atop the tower was a simple square lantern room, glazed to seaward, which contained an innovative lighting array.

==== Walker's parabolic reflectors ====
The lantern was equipped with parabolic reflectors and oil lamps in place of a coal fire. Thus Hunstanton is said to have been the first 'major coast light' in Britain to employ an illuminant other than coal, and the first lighthouse in the world to be fitted with a parabolic reflector (though similar claims are made for Hutchinson's lighthouses in Liverpool).

The lighting apparatus was devised and installed by Ezekiel Walker of Lynn, who later went on to advise the Northern Lighthouse Board on installing parabolic reflectors in their towers around the coast of Scotland. As described in 1812, the light was provided by eighteen lamps set within 18-inch (460 mm) diameter reflectors 'fixed upon two shelves, one placed over the other'; the lamps were arranged so as to direct the greatest concentration of light in a north by east direction, indicating to far-off vessels a way through sands and shoals off the Lincolnshire coast. Writing some fifty years after they were installed, Walker described them as follows: 'Each of the reflectors at Hunstanton contains 700 small mirrors of looking-glass, every one of which reflects part of the light of the small lamp placed in its focus'. The light was described in 1781 as 'constant and certain' and 'clearly distinguished at sea at a distance of seven leagues', (though this latter claim has been called 'extravagant').

In 1788 Everard sold his patent rights to Samuel Lane, Collector of Customs for the Port of Lynn. Forty years later, Hunstanton was one of just five lighthouses in England still in private hands, and in 1836 legislation was enacted which empowered the Corporation of Trinity House to purchase the leases of these last remaining private concessions; the following year, Hunstanton and the other lights were vested in Trinity House.

=== Current lighthouse ===
Trinity House promptly began work on replacing the wooden tower and its light, technology having advanced significantly in the sixty years since it was built. Work began in 1838 on a new lighthouse: designed by James Walker and built by William Candler of Lynn, it was first lit on 3 September 1840. It was a white-painted cylindrical brick tower, 63 feet (19 m) high, which placed the light at an elevation of 109 feet (33 m) above sea level; In place of the multiple lamps and reflectors, a single three-wick oil lamp was installed, set within a sizeable (second-order) fixed catadioptric optic, designed by J. Cookson & co. of Newcastle-upon-Tyne. The lighthouse initially displayed a fixed white light as before; but from 1844 a red sector was added to the light, indicating the position of the Roaring Middle shoal. The light had a range of 16 nautical miles (30 km; 18 mi).

The new lighthouse was flanked by a pair of two-storey gabled houses for the keepers, which were connected by castellated wings to the lighthouse itself. The cost of building the tower and the dwellings together came to £2,696 13s 3d.

In 1883 Hunstanton Lighthouse was altered to display a group occulting light (the lamp being eclipsed twice for two seconds apiece, every thirty seconds). In 1897 the tower was repainted red, with a broad white stripe.

==== Decommissioning ====
The present lighthouse ceased operations in 1921, and the lantern storey was removed from the top of the tower the following year. To compensate for its closure, improvements were made to the light of the Inner Dowsing lightvessel.

In 1922 the lighthouse was sold at auction for £1,300; the tower was left unused, but the adjacent cottages were converted into tearooms. Between 1934 and 1957 the tower was used as an observation post by the Royal Observer Corps (it was at this time that an additional storey was added to the top of the tower where the lantern had formerly stood). Acquired subsequently by Hunstanton Urban District Council, the property was sold by them in 1965, to become a private residence and later a holiday let. The two keepers' houses remained in place until at least the early 1960s, since when one has been demolished, and a modern annexe has been added to the other.

== Gallery ==
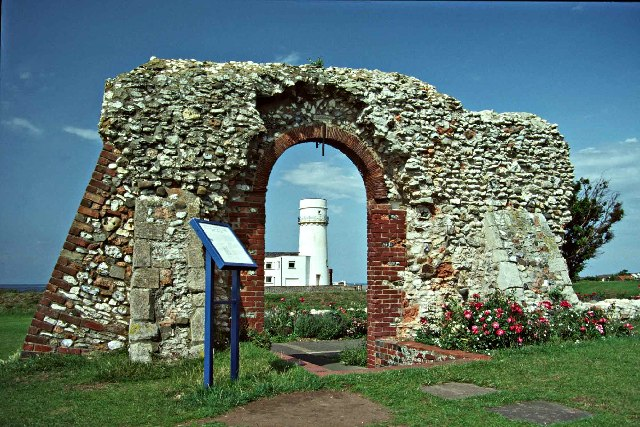
Remains of St Edmund's Chapel and Lighthouse.

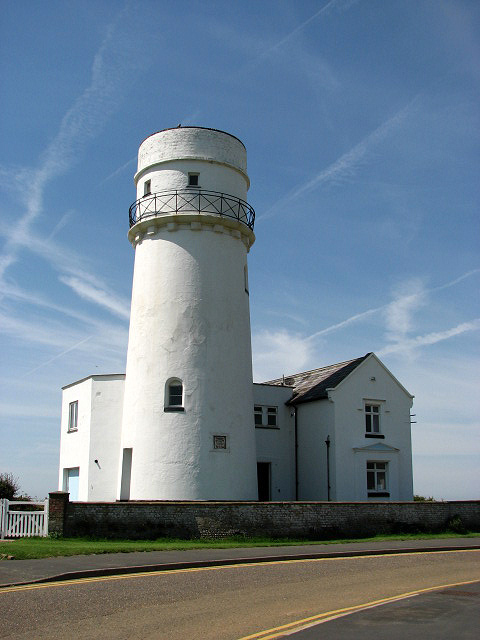
Close-up view

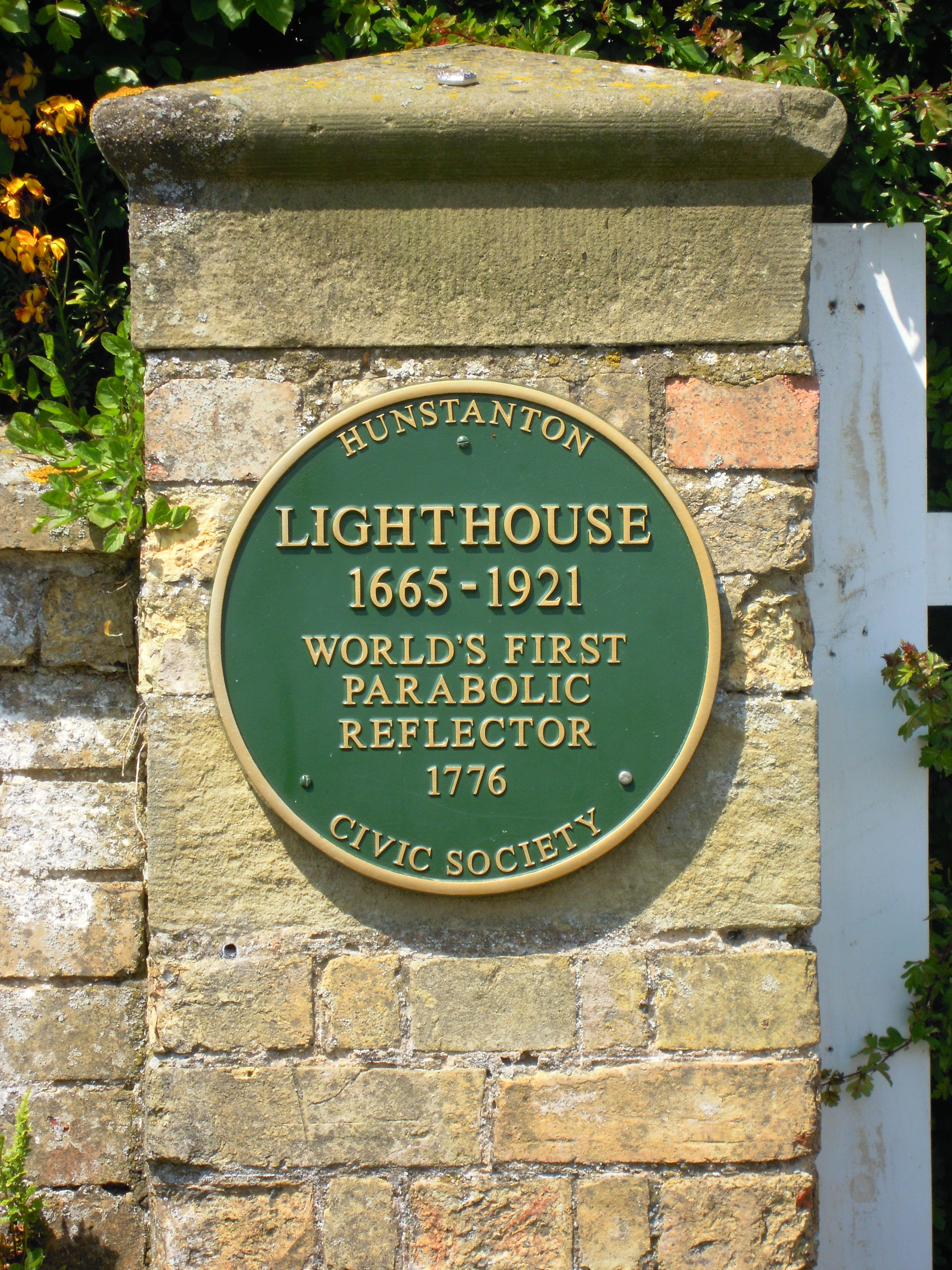
Plaque outside the lighthouse

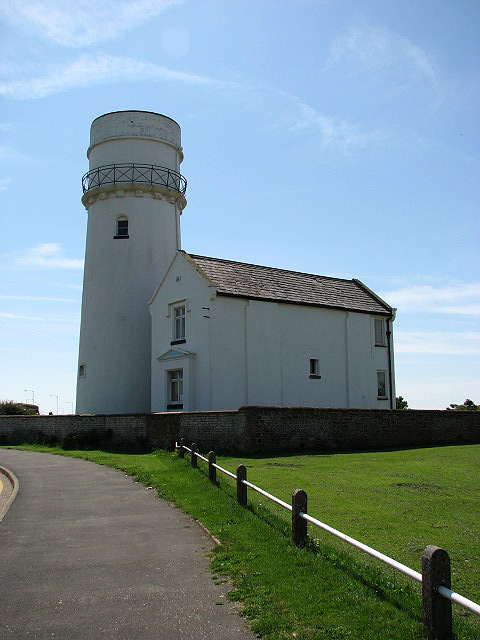
Another view

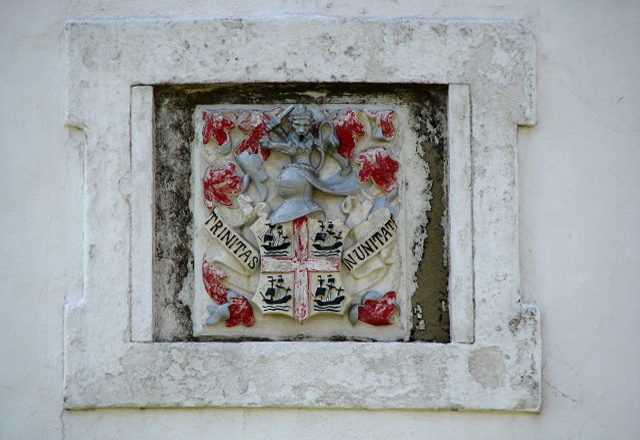
Trinity House coat of arms on the tower

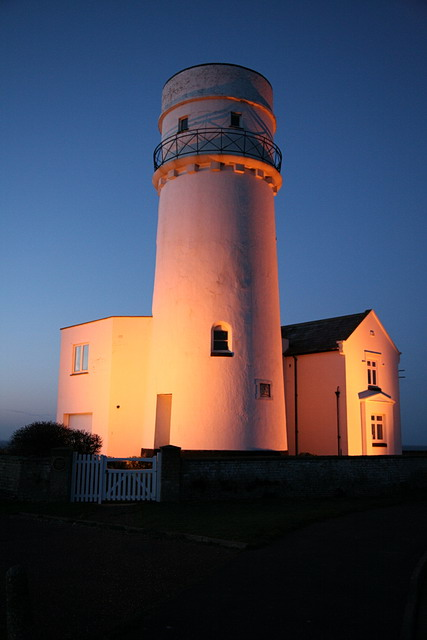
The lighthouse at dusk

== See also ==
- List of lighthouses in England
