= Hunstanton Town Hall =

Municipal building in Hunstanton, Norfolk, England

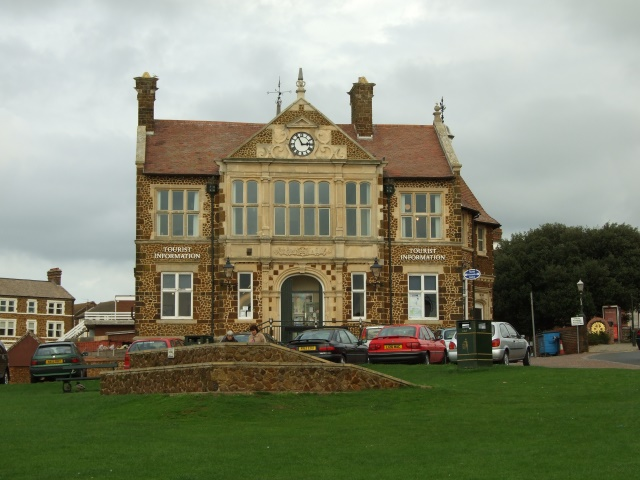
- Hunstanton Town Hall

- Shown in Norfolk
- 52.9402°N 0.4887°E
- Location: The Green, Hunstanton

History
- Built: 1896

Site notes
- Architect: George Skipper
- Architectural style: Jacobethan style

Listed Building – Grade II
- Official name: Town Hall
- Designated: 20 September 1984
- Reference no.: 1171478

Hunstanton Town Hall is a municipal building on The Green in Hunstanton, Norfolk, England. The structure, which is the meeting place of Hunstanton Town Council, is a grade II listed building.

== History ==
Following significant population growth, largely associated with the seaside tourism industry, the area became an urban district in 1894. The new council decided to commission a town hall: the site they selected was on the north side of The Green, a triangular piece of land which formed the focal point of the original civic masterplan for the town, prepared by the founder of Hunstanton, Henry L'Estrange Styleman Le Strange. The new building was designed by George Skipper in the Jacobethan style, built in carrstone and was completed in 1896.

The design involved a symmetrical main frontage with three bays facing onto The Green; the central bay, which slightly projected forward, featured a wide doorway with a hood mould flanked by pilasters, which supported an entablature inscribed with the words "Town Hall", and beyond that, it was flanked by a single casement windows; on the first floor there was a central four-part window flanked by pilasters and, beyond that, it was flanked by two-light windows. The outer bays were fenestrated by cross windows on the ground floor and by three-light mullioned and transomed windows on the first floor. The central bay was surmounted by a cornice and a pediment with a clock and some strapwork in the tympanum. (The clock was by John Smith & Sons of Derby.) Internally, the principal rooms were the main assembly hall at the rear of the building, and the council chamber and the clerk's office on the first floor.

During the First World War, the Lovat Scouts were billeted in the town hall while serving on home defence duties and, after the war, once the building had been returned to municipal use, it was also put to use as a theatre. The building continued to serve as the meeting place of Hunstanton Urban District Council for much of the 20th century but ceased to be the local seat of government when West Norfolk Council was formed in 1974. However, the building continued to be used as the offices and meeting place of Hunstanton Town Council; a tourist information centre was also established on the ground floor of the building.

In May 2016, a ceremony was held at the town hall to implement a twinning agreement with the US 67th Special Operations Squadron; the agreement commemorated the North Sea flood of 1953 when the local sea defences were overwhelmed by a storm surge, with up to 10 feet (3.0 m) of seawater flooding the local area. The 67th Air Rescue Squadron, which was based at RAF Sculthorpe, was mobilised to help but, despite the efforts of the American service personnel, 31 people (16 American and 15 British) died in the disaster.

A statue depicting Le Stange, which was designed by Alan Herriot and financed by a reallocation of funds from the Heritage Lottery Fund and by a grant from West Norfolk Council, was unveiled outside the town hall in June 2017. A major programme of refurbishment works was completed in September 2021, and a new art gallery, exhibiting work by local artists including some of the members of the West Norfolk Artists Association, opened in the area formerly occupied by the tourist information centre in February 2022.
