= St Mary's Church, Old Hunstanton =

Parish church in Norfolk

Coordinates: 52°56′55″N 0°30′45″E

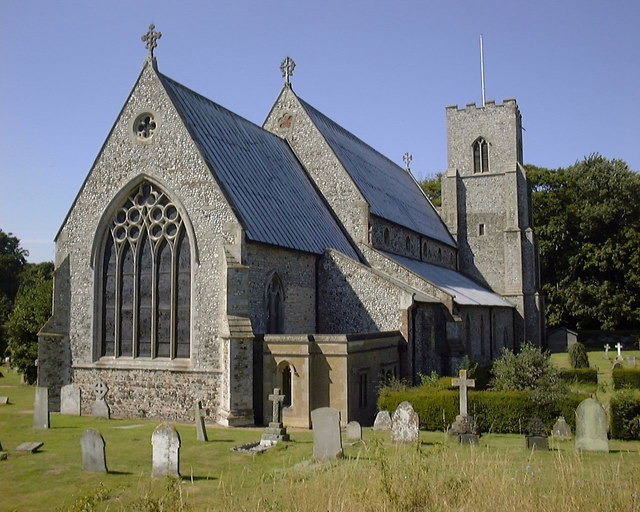
St Mary's Church, Old Hunstanton

St Mary's Church is the parish church of Old Hunstanton in the English county of Norfolk. It is dedicated to the Virgin Mary. The church was built in 14th-century Perpendicular, and restored in 1860 by Frederick Preedy at the instigation of Henry Le Strange. It is Grade I listed.

== History ==
The church is 14th-century, and replaced an earlier Norman building. The only remnant of the Norman church is the font.

The church is built from flint, with a tower in the north west and north and south aisles. The south porch is a 19th-century addition.

== Architecture and fittings ==
The Norman font is in the traditional location at the west of the nave. The lower panels of the chancel screen are 16th-century.

There is a single tenor bell, by John Stephens of Norwich and dating from 1726.

=== Stained glass windows ===
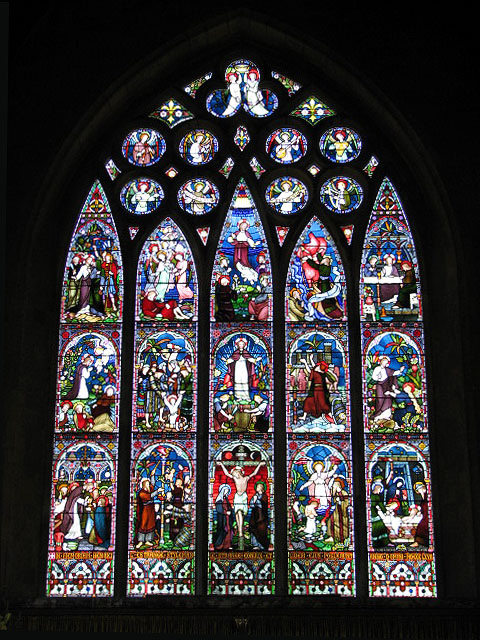
The east window

Most of the stained glass dates from the 1860s refurbishment. The five-light east window is generally regarded as Preedy's greatest work. Preedy also designed the three-light Tree of Jesse east window in the south aisle chapel; there are also windows by Powell and Paul Quail.

=== Organ ===
The organ was built in 1936 by J. W. Walker & Sons Ltd; the organ case was built by Sir Walter Tapper. Walkers undertook various refurbishments and modifications; the most recent refurbishment was by W. & A. Boggis of Diss in 2008.

== Bats ==
The church is home to a roost of common pipistrelle and soprano pipistrelle bats.
