= George Grundy =

English cricketer

Personal information
- Full name: George Graham Stewart Grundy
- Born: 24 June 1859; Cheetham Hill, Lancashire, England
- Died: 4 March 1945 (aged 85); Hunstanton, Norfolk, England
- Batting: Left-handed
- Bowling: Right-arm (unknown style)

Domestic team information
- Years: Team
- 1880: Sussex

Career statistics
Competition	First-class
Matches	2
Runs scored	45
Batting average	11.25
100s/50s	0/0
Top score	20
Catches/stumpings	0/–
- Source: Cricinfo, 11 December 2011

George Graham Stewart Grundy (24 June 1859 – 4 March 1945) was an English cricketer. Grundy was a left-handed batsman who was a right-arm bowler, though his exact bowling style is unknown. He was born at Cheetham Hill, Lancashire and was educated at Harrow School.

Grundy made two first-class appearances for Sussex in 1880 against Kent and Surrey. In the match against Kent, Grundy was dismissed for 4 runs in Sussex's first-innings by Charles Cunliffe, while in their second-innings he was dismissed by the same bowler for 20 runs. Kent won the match by 10 wickets. Against Surrey, he was dismissed for 3 runs in Sussex's first-innings by Joseph Potter, while in their second-innings he scored 4 runs before he was caught by George Elliott off the bowling of Walter Read. Surrey won the match by 4 wickets.

He died at Hunstanton, Norfolk on 4 March 1945.
