= Hun River =

Hun River may refer to:

- Hun River (Liao River tributary) in northeastern China
- Hun River (Yalu River tributary) in northeastern China
- River Hun, a stream in Norfolk, England
