= St Mary's Church, Burnham Deepdale =

Church in Burnham Deepdale, Norfolk, England

Coordinates: 52.965741°N 0.685422°E

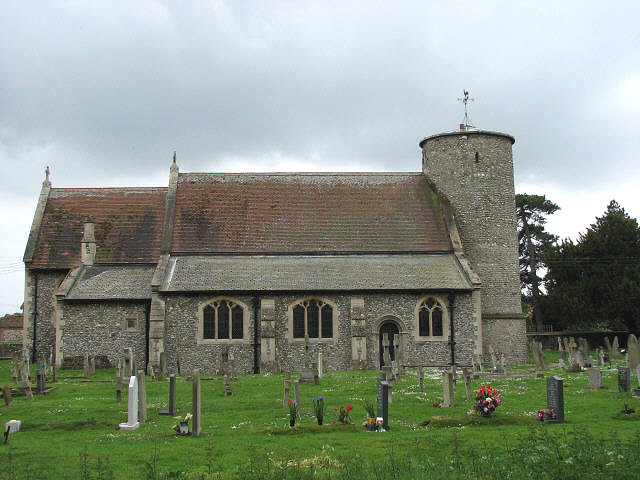
St Mary's Church

St Mary's Church is a round-tower church in Burnham Deepdale, Norfolk, England. Its round tower and some other parts of the building date from the 11th century. The church underwent additions and rebuilding in the medieval period. It fell into disrepair by the early 18th century, and much of the current building's appearance dates from an 1870 renovation by Frederick Preedy. The church is famed for its many 14th- and 15th-century medieval stained glass windows, and for its Norman font depicting the Labours of the Months.

== Architecture ==
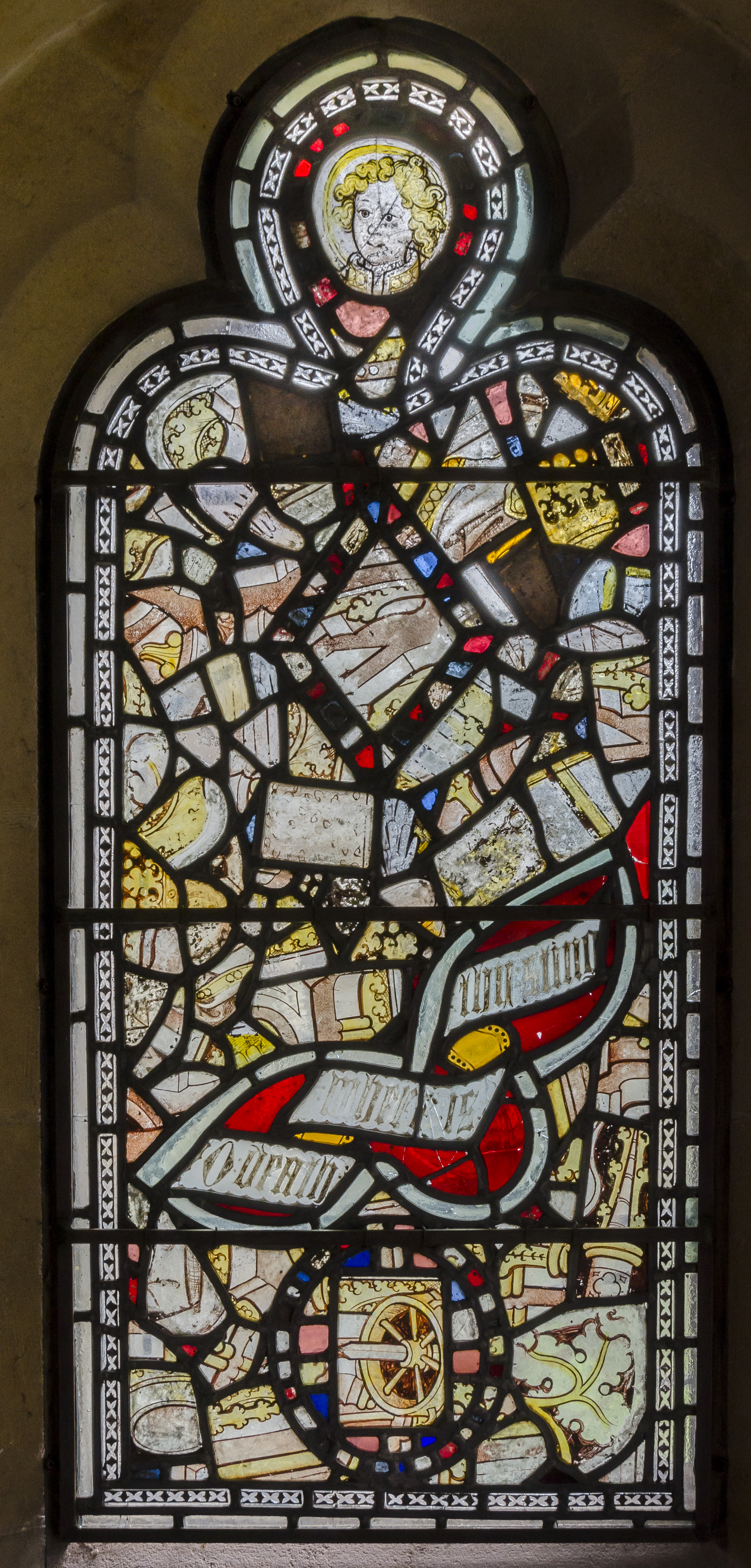
Sun window

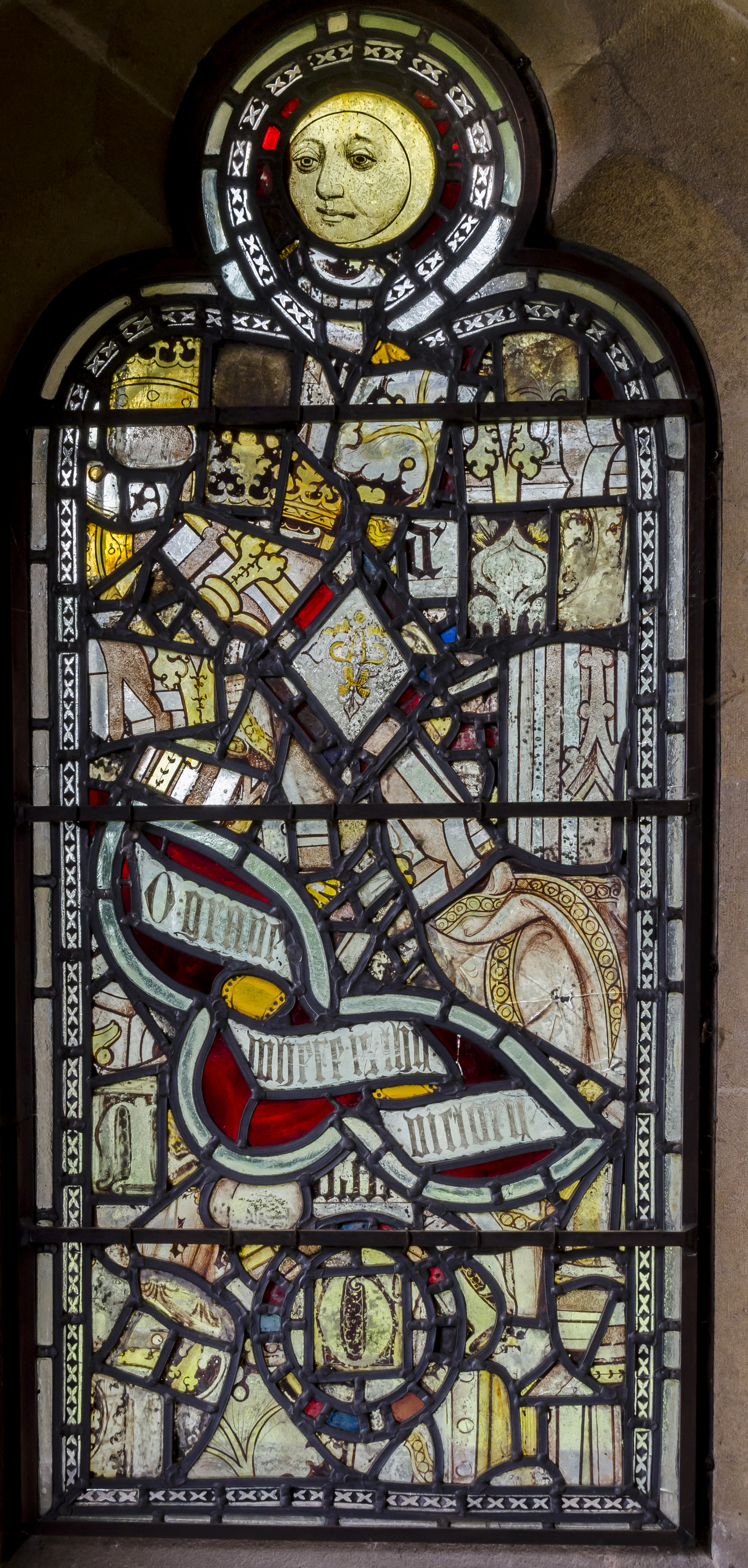
Moon window

Medieval porch windows, topped with images representing the Sun and Moon

The village of Burnham Deepdale is one of the Norfolk Burnhams, a group of villages in Norfolk, England. Approximately 8 miles (10 km) west of Wells-next-the-Sea, it is separated from the sea by tidal marshes.

Burnham Deepdale's parish church, St Mary's, is adjacent to the A149 road which runs through the village. It is one of 129 surviving round-tower churches in Norfolk. Its dates of construction are unrecorded, but the oldest parts of the structure are thought to be the round tower at the west of the church, and the wall adjoining the tower. These are both thought to be of Anglo-Saxon construction, built before the Norman Conquest of England.

The round tower is built of flint, and rises to a belfry at the top with narrow trellis windows. The walls of the lowest part of the tower are slightly thicker than the remainder of the structure, and are believed to have been rebuilt or extensively renovated at some point. The round tower is capped with a metal roof made of lead, although it is believed that when originally built it was tiled.

Some elements such as a northern doorway were added to the Anglo-Saxon building during the Norman period, with further additions and renovations such as a 15th-century Perpendicular chancel arch in subsequent centuries. By the early 18th century the church had fallen into a degree of disrepair, and was described as "a gloomy moss-covered cavern". A programme of renovation works in the late 18th and 19th centuries cleaned and repaired the building, and the building underwent major reconstruction in 1870 under the direction of Frederick Preedy.

== Internal elements ==
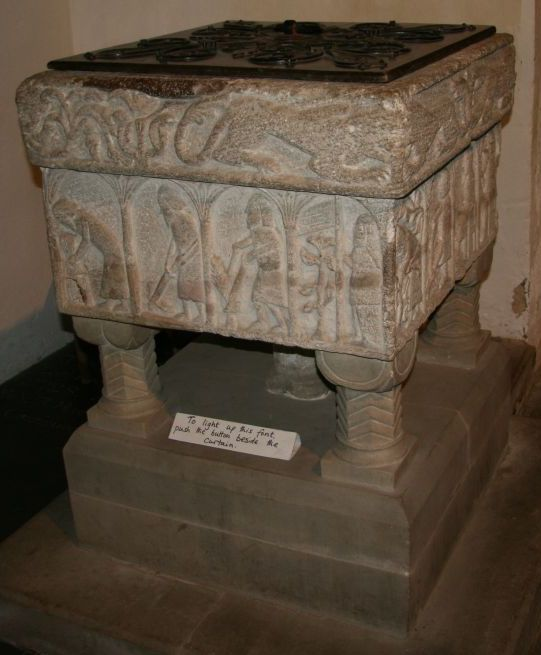
The Norman font

The church is famed for its many medieval stained glass windows, most of which date from the 14th and 15th centuries.

The church is also noted for its Norman font. Carved from Barnack stone, its exterior is divided into 12 panels, depicting the Labours of the Months, a typical rural activity for each of the 12 months of the year. (Note: The Labours of the Months depicted on the font are: January, drinking; February, keeping warm; March, digging; April, pruning; May, either beating the bounds or the Risen Christ;, June, weeding; July, mowing; August, binding a sheaf; September, threshing; October, milling; November, slaughtering a pig; December, feasting.) The font broke into three pieces while being moved during building works in 1797, and the pieces were removed from the church and used to decorate the garden of the rectory at Fincham. In the 1840s the pieces were reassembled, partially restored, and returned to the church; the font was subsequently more fully restored, and worn elements reground, to return it to its original appearance.

The carved altarpiece by Walter Tapper dates from 1932.

In 1953 the church was Grade II* listed. The church remains in regular use for weekly Sunday services, and also hosts stalls during the annual Deepdale Christmas Market.
