= Hunstanton Cliffs =

UK Site of Special Scientific Interest

Coordinates: 52.949°N 0.493°E

- Site of Special Scientific Interest
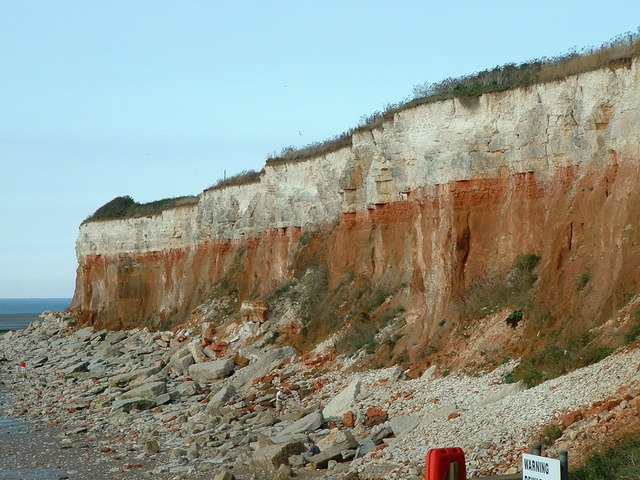
- Location of Hunstanton Cliffs.
- Area of search: Norfolk, England
- Grid reference: TF 676 420
- Interest: Biological; Geological
- Area: 4.6 hectares (11 acres)
- Notification date: 1984
- Location map: Magic Map

Hunstanton Cliffs is a 4.6-hectare (11-acre) biological and geological Site of Special Scientific Interest in Hunstanton in Norfolk, England. It is a Geological Conservation Review site.

These eroding cliffs expose a mid-Cretaceous sequence from the Albian to the succeeding Cenomanian around 100 million years ago, with exceptionally rich Albian ammonite fossils. Biological interest is provided by a colony of breeding fulmars on the cliff face.

There is public access to the beach.
