= Joseph Potter (cricketer) =

English cricketer

Personal information
- Full name: Joseph Potter
- Born: 13 January 1839; Northampton, Northamptonshire
- Died: 2 June 1906 (aged 67); Northampton, Northamptonshire
- Batting: Right-handed
- Bowling: Right-arm medium

Domestic team information
- Years: Team
- 1860–1880: Northampton Cricket Club
- 1869–1888: Northants
- 1871: Kent
- 1875–1881: Surrey
- 1882–1888: Wiltshire County Cricket Club
- FC debut: 19 June 1871 Kent v Lancashire
- Last FC: 29 August 1881 Surrey v Middlesex

Career statistics
| Competition | First-class |
|---|---|
| Matches | 38 |
| Runs scored | 357 |
| Batting average | 6.61 |
| 100s/50s | 0/0 |
| Top score | 27* |
| Balls bowled | 7,144 |
| Wickets | 100 |
| Bowling average | 21.11 |
| 5 wickets in innings | 7 |
| 10 wickets in match | 3 |
| Best bowling | 7/31 |
| Catches/stumpings | 32/– |
- Source: CricInfo, 24 October 2018

Joseph Potter (13 January 1839 – 2 June 1906), also known as Joe Potter, was an English professional cricketer who played between the 1860 and 1890. He played most of his first-class cricket for Surrey County Cricket Club but also represented a variety of other teams.

Potter was born at Northampton in 1839, the son of Thomas and Matilda Potter. By trade he was an iron worker, as his father had been, but was employed as a professional at Northampton Cricket Club between 1860 and 1865 before moving to New Brompton in Chatham, Kent. He ran the Cricketers Inn in New Brompton and was employed in Clapham by the officers of the Royal Engineers Cricket Club, again as a professional cricketer. During 1871 he played twice in first-class matches for Kent County Cricket Club, the team having a strong link with the RE who had bases at Chatham and Woolwich in the county. Potter was described in his Wisden obituary as being a "fair batsman and a useful right-hand medium-paced bowler".

During 1873 Potter moved to Prince's Cricket Ground in London before he was employed at The Oval, playing 35 first-class matches for Surrey between 1875 and 1881. He took 78 wickets for Surrey in 1880 at a bowling average of 16 runs a wicket, including taking seven wickets for the cost of 31 runs against Gloucestershire. He had scored his only county cricket century the previous year, making 105 runs against Somerset in a match which did not have first-class status. His highest score in first-class matches was 27 not out.

Potter also played one first-class match for the South and played minor cricket for Northampton until 1880. In 1882 he moved to become a cricket coach at Marlborough College in Wiltshire. Between 1882 and 188 he played occasionally for Wiltshire and more frequently for his native Northamptonshire, taking 131 wickets for Northants at an average of less than 10 runs per wicket. He later coached Northants, and umpired 37 first-class matches between 1891 and 1897.

Potter married Jane Belham in 1859; the couple had nine children. In retirement he ran The Cricketers' Arms in Northampton and established a financially unsuccessful iron foundry in the town. He died at Northampton in 1906 aged 67.

== Bibliography ==
- Carlaw, Derek (2020). Kent County Cricketers, A to Z: Part One (1806–1914) (PDF). Cardiff: ACS.
