= Frederick Preedy =

British architect (1820–1898)

Frederick Preedy (2 June 1820 – 28 March 1898) was an architect and glass painter in England.

== Life ==
Preedy was born in Offenham near Evesham in Worcestershire and died at his son's home in Croydon. During his early life, his family moved from Offenham to nearby Fladbury. Following his death a memorial was erected to him in the church of St John the Baptist, Fladbury, Worcestershire. This also remembers his wife Mary (1831 - 1889), and daughter Alice Mary (1860 - 1899). He was buried at Foxham in Wiltshire.

== Career ==
He trained as an architect in Worcester with Harvey Eginton. Following the early death of Eginton in 1849 he set up his own architectural practice in Worcester. In 1860 he moved his business to London.

For his early churches he commissioned stained glass windows from George Rogers in Worcester, but after around 1853 began to make his own glass. He is thought to be the only architect of his time who also both designed and made his stained glass windows.[2] His legacy includes windows in Worcester Cathedral, Gloucester Cathedral, Lincoln Cathedral and Ely Cathedral, and numerous parish churches, particularly in Herefordshire, Worcestershire and Norfolk.

== New buildings ==
- Church of St. Paul, Gorefield, Cambridgeshire (1869-71)
- Village School and Teacher's House, Weston-sub-Edge, Gloucestershire (1852)
- Village School, Ashperton, Herefordshire (1856)
- Church of St. David, Little Dewchurch, Herefordshire (1869-70)
- Church of St. John the Evangelist and New Vicarage, Storridge, Herefordshire (1855-56)
- St. Mary's Church, Burnham Deepdale, Norfolk (1870)
- Church of St. Edmund, King and Martyr, Hunstanton, Norfolk (1865)
- All Saints' Church, Kettlestone, Norfolk (1869)
- Rectory and Village School, Arrow, Warwickshire, Warwickshire (1865)
- Church of St. Peter, Binton, Warwickshire (1876)
- All Saints' Church, Kings Heath, Birmingham, Warwickshire (1860 (with Edward Holmes))
- St. Anne's Church, Moseley, Birmingham, Warwickshire (1873-4)
- Church of St. Andrew, Temple Grafton, Warwickshire (1875)
- Church of St. James, Bishampton, Worcestershire (1869-70)
- Village School, Callow End, Worcestershire
- Church of St. Paul, Cookhill, Worcestershire (1875)
- Church of St. John the Baptist, Crowle, Worcestershire (1881-2)
- Workhouse Chapel, Evesham, Worcestershire (1879-80)
- Village School, Fladbury, Worcestershire (1865)
- Church of All Saints, Hollybush, Worcestershire (1869)
- Church of St. Thomas, Lower Moor, Worcestershire (1868-69)
- Church of St. Mary and Village School, Madresfield, Worcestershire (1866-67)
- Church of St. Mary and St. Milburgh, Offenham, Worcestershire (1861)
- Church of St. Peter, Pedmore, Worcestershire (1869-71)
- Village School, Powick, Worcestershire (1871)
- St. Luke's Church, Church of St. George the Martyr and Church of St. Philip, Redditch, Worcestershire (1867/1876)
- Church of St. Mary Magdelene, Worcester, Worcestershire (1876-77)
- Church of St. Stephen, Worcester, Worcestershire (1861-62)
- Church of St. Mary the Virgin, Wythall, Worcestershire (1862)

== Restoration work ==
- St Mary's Church, Burnham Deepdale, Norfolk
- St. Mary's Church, Ditchingham, Norfolk (chancel arch and nave roof, 1870s)
- St Mary's Church, Old Hunstanton, Norfolk (1860s).
- St. Nicholas' Church, Feltwell, Norfolk (1860s)
- St. Mary's Church, Feltwell, Norfolk (1890s)
- Hunstanton Hall, Hunstanton, Norfolk (1870s)
- St. Mary's Church, Gunthorpe, Norfolk (1860s)
- Church of St. John the Baptist, Lea Marston, Warwickshire (new tower, 1876)
- All Saints' Church, Church Lench, Worcestershire (chancel restoration, 1854)
- Church of St Mary & St Milburgh, Offenham Worcestershire

== Stained glass ==
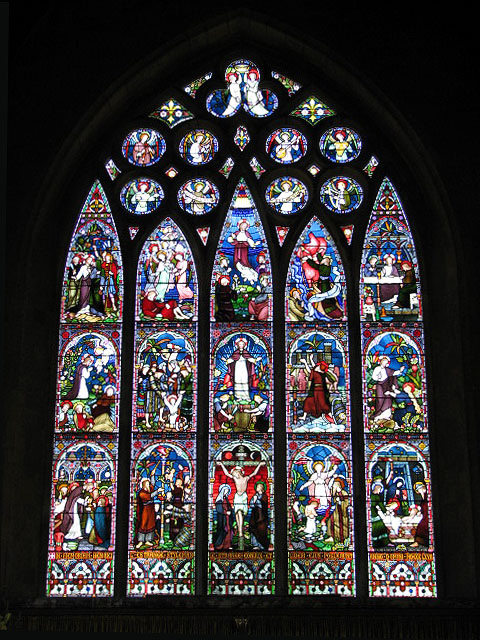
East window of St Mary's Church, Old Hunstanton

- St. Clement's Church, Leigh-on-Sea, Essex (1872)
- St. Peter's Church, Little Ellingham, Norfolk
- St. Barnabus' Church, Horton-cum-Studley, Oxfordshire (1867)
- All Saints' Church, Claverley, Shropshire
- St. Edith's Church, Eaton-under-Heywood, Shropshire (1869)
- St. Peter's Church, South Hiendley, West Yorkshire
