= Burnham Deepdale =

Village in Norfolk, England

Coordinates: 52°59′N 0°43′E

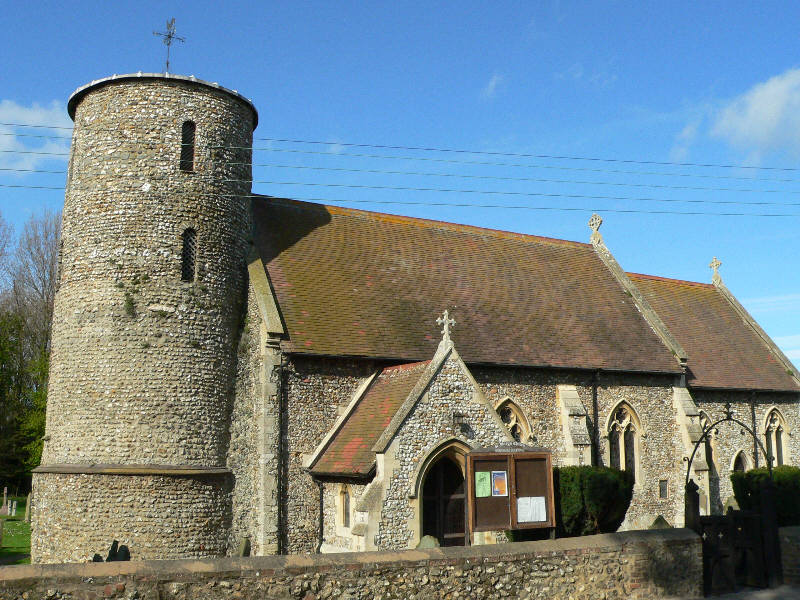
- St Mary's Church

- Location within Norfolk
- Civil parish: Brancaster
- District: King's Lynn and West Norfolk
- Shire county: Norfolk
- Region: East
- Country: England
- Sovereign state: United Kingdom
- Post town: KING'S LYNN
- Postcode district: PE31
- Dialling code: 01485
- Police: Norfolk
- Fire: Norfolk
- Ambulance: East of England
- UK Parliament: North West Norfolk

Burnham Deepdale is a village and former civil parish, now in the parish of Brancaster, in the King's Lynn and West Norfolk district, in the English county of Norfolk. It is 18 miles (29 km) north-east of King's Lynn and 35 miles (56 km) north-west of Norwich. The village is along the A149 road between King's Lynn and Great Yarmouth and overlooks Brancaster Manor marshlands.

== History ==
Burnham Deepdale's name is of Anglo-Saxon origin and derives from the Old English for a settlement along the River Burn with a deep valley. The village is listed in the Domesday Book as a settlement of four households in the hundred of Brothercross. It was part of the estates of Roger Bigod.

In 1931 the parish had a population of 81. This was the last time separate population statistics were recorded for Burnham Deepdale and on 1 April 1935 the parish was abolished and merged with Brancaster.

== St Mary's Church ==
Burnham Deepdale's church is dedicated to Saint Mary and is one of Norfolk's 124 remaining round-tower churches. The church is on the A149 and is Grade II listed. The church was significantly remodelled in the 1870s by Frederick Preedy but still retains some of its medieval stained-glass windows. The church has a stoned carved font which has been called "one of Norfolk's most remarkable" and a carved altarpiece by Walter Tapper dating from 1932.

== Notable people ==
- Rupert Everett (b.1959), actor, born in Burnham Deepdale.
