= Hunstanton =

Seaside town in Norfolk, England

Coordinates: 52.93°N 0.48°E

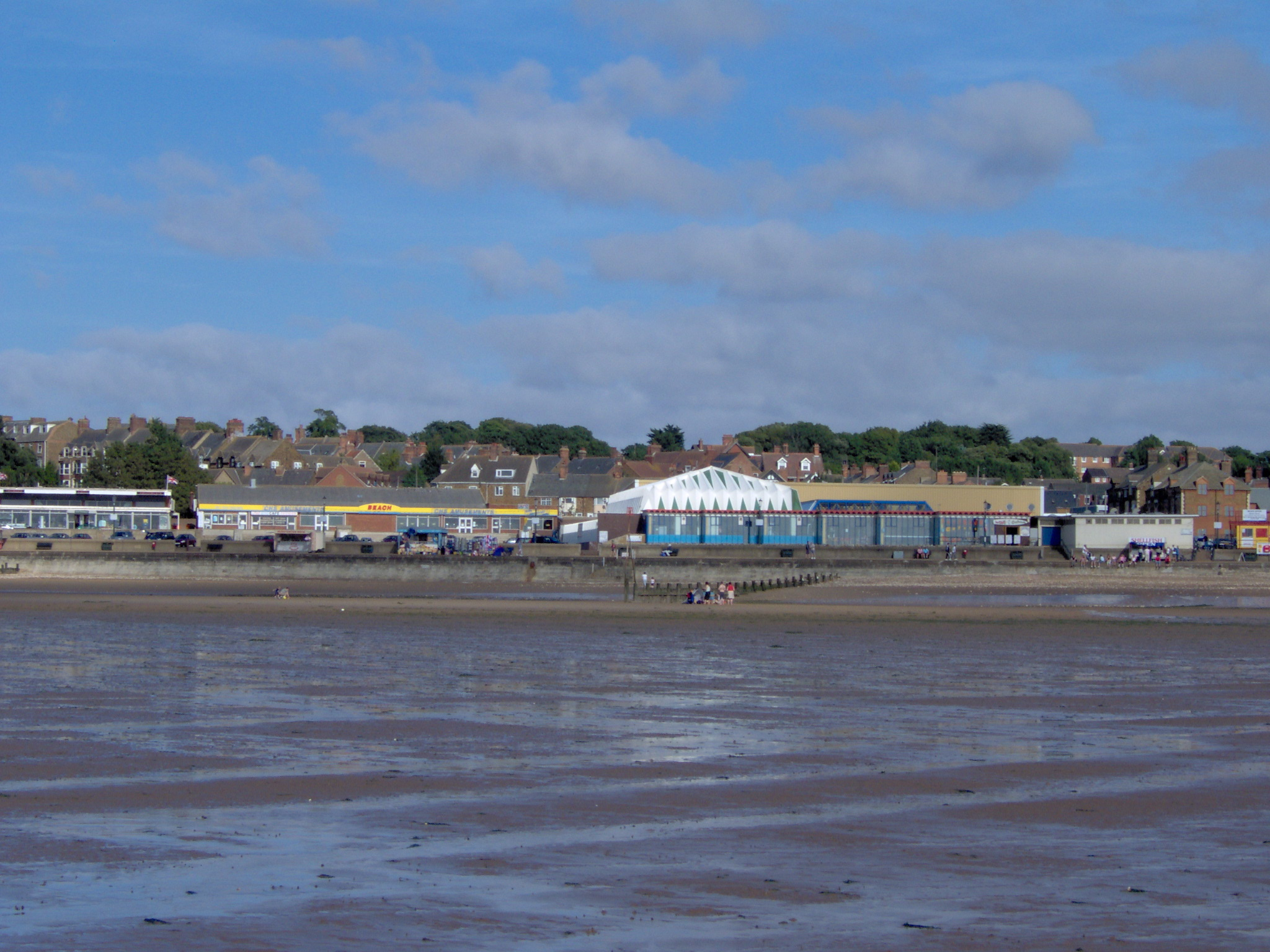
- View of Hunstanton front from the beach

- Location within Norfolk
- Population: 4,370 (Parish, 2021); 4,193 (Built up area, 2021)
- OS grid reference: TF6740
- Civil parish: Hunstanton
- District: King's Lynn and West Norfolk
- Shire county: Norfolk
- Region: East
- Country: England
- Sovereign state: United Kingdom
- Post town: Hunstanton
- Postcode district: PE36
- Dialling code: 01485
- Police: Norfolk
- Fire: Norfolk
- Ambulance: East of England
- UK Parliament: North West Norfolk

Hunstanton (sometimes pronounced /ˈhʌnstən/) is a seaside town and civil parish in the King's Lynn and West Norfolk district, in the county of Norfolk, England. The town's seafront faces west across The Wash. Hunstanton lies 102 miles (164 km) north-north-east of London and 40 miles (64 km) north-west of Norwich. At the 2021 census, the parish had a population of 4,370 and the built-up area had a population of 4,193.

== Etymology and pronunciation ==
The original settlement, now Old Hunstanton, probably gained its name from the River Hun, which runs to the coast just to the east. It has also been argued that the name originated from "Honeystone", referring to the local red carrstone.

The town's name is often pronounced "Hunstan"; "Hunston" (the emphasis is placed upon the vowel of the first syllable). Peter Trudgill suggests that in the 8th Century CE Hunstanton was called hunstans-tūn, meaning 'the homestead of Hunstan', but that this three-syllable pronunciation "eventually and quite naturally acquired a more reduced form, Hunst'nt'n, which was later further reduced to Hunst'n". He writes that the original form would "most certainly not come down to us as Hun-STAN-ton - that is a modern mistake". The "authentic old three-syllable pronunciation" is, he asserts, "HUN-st'n-t'n"

== History ==
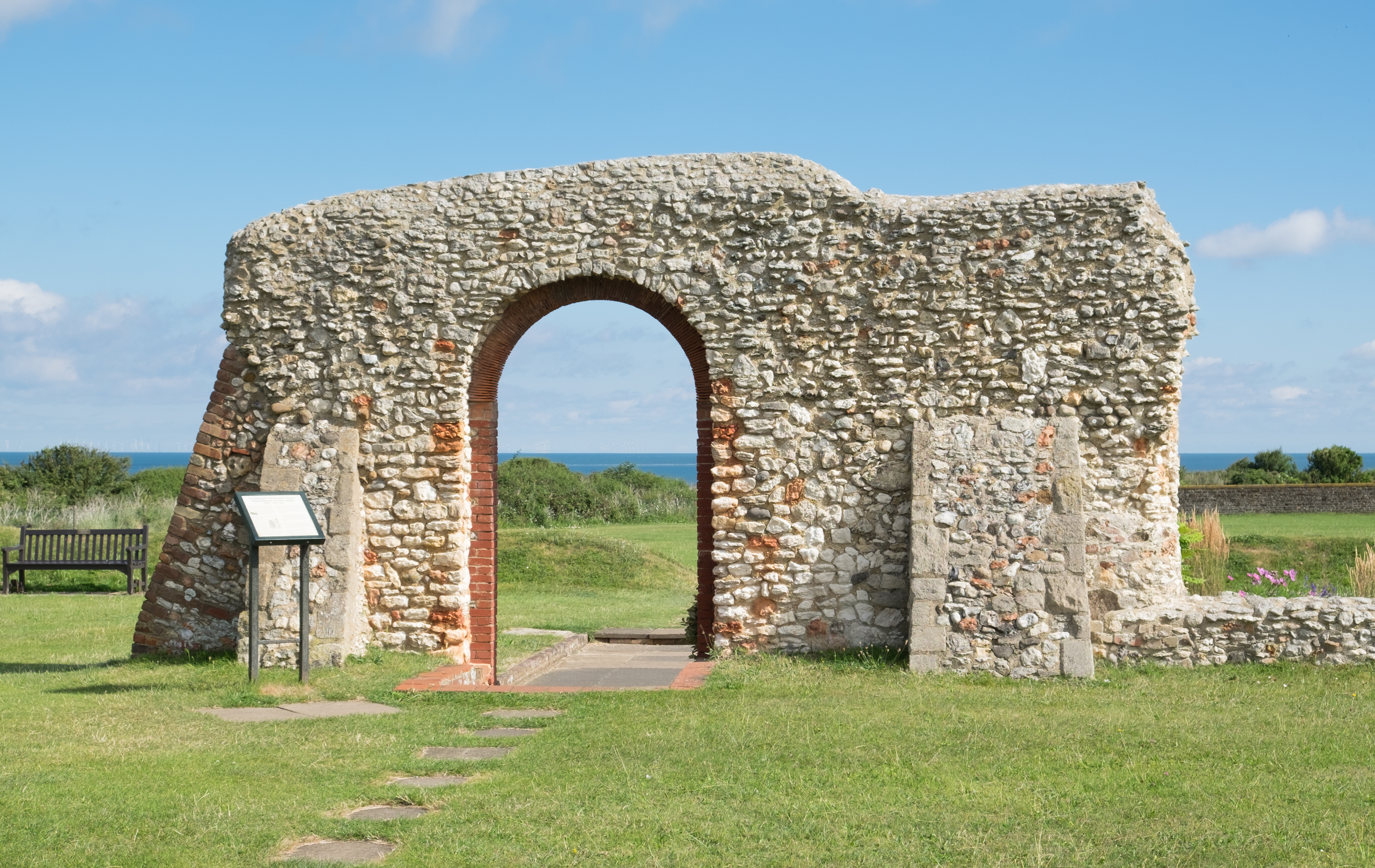
Remains of St Edmund's Memorial Chapel in 2016

Hunstanton is a 19th-century resort town, initially known as New Hunstanton to distinguish it from the adjacent village of that name. The new town soon exceeded the village in scale and population.

In 1846, Henry L'Estrange Styleman Le Strange (1815–1862), decided to develop the area south of Old Hunstanton as a bathing resort. He brought a group of like-minded investors into building a railway line from King's Lynn. In 1861, Le Strange, as principal landowner, became a director of the railway company. By 1862 the line had been built. Le Strange died that year at the age of 47, leaving his son Hamon to reap the rewards of his efforts. The Lynn and Hunstanton Railway became one of the most consistently profitable in the country.

Le Strange moved the ancient village cross from Old Hunstanton to a new site in 1846. In 1848 the first main building, the Royal Hotel (now the Golden Lion), was built by Victorian architect, William Butterfield, a friend of Le Strange. Overlooking a sloping green and the sea, and for several years standing alone, it earned the nickname "Le Strange's Folly". In 1850 Le Strange, an amateur architect and painter, appointed a land agent to survey the site and prepare a plan. Le Strange drew and painted a map and a perspective of the scheme, showing shops, a station and a church. He consulted William Butterfield on the design. Their shared passion was for an "Old English" style of architecture for domestic buildings, owing much to medieval precedents and the earnest Victorian Gothic Revival. Hunstanton came to exemplify a 19th-century estate seaside town. Most of the fabric and character of that development survives.

In 1915, during the First World War, Hunstanton was the headquarters of the West Norfolk training programme of the Queen's Own Cameron Highlanders, as they prepared for active service on the Western Front. Among them were regimental bagpiper Iain Eairdsidh MacAsgaill (1898-1934), and poet Dòmhnall Ruadh Chorùna (1887-1967).

Hunstanton was hit badly by the North Sea flood of 1953. The wall of water on the night of 31 January – 1 February killed 31 people, 16 of them United States military personnel and their families. There were 35 more victims in neighbouring Snettisham and Heacham.

== Governance ==
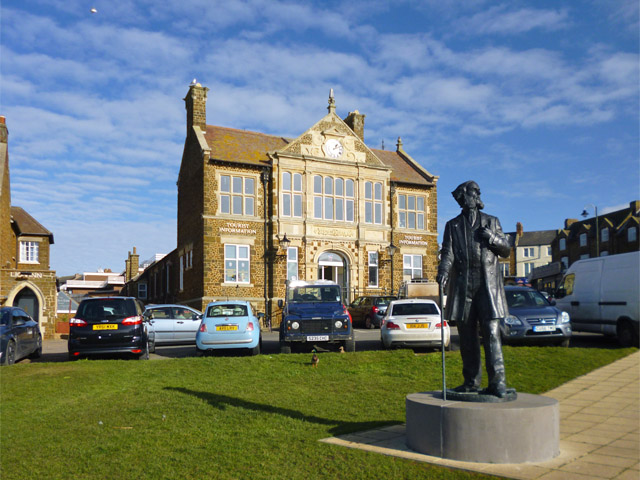
Hunstanton Town Hall and the statue of Henry Styleman Le Strange

There are three tiers of local government covering Hunstanton, at parish (town), district, and county level: Hunstanton Town Council, the Borough Council of King's Lynn and West Norfolk, and Norfolk County Council. The town council is based at Hunstanton Town Hall on The Green.

=== Administrative history ===
The new town of Hunstanton grew up in the 19th century within the ancient parish of Hunstanton. In 1891, a local government district called Hunstanton was created just covering the part of the parish around the growing new town. The district was then administered by an elected local board, which first met in May 1891.

Under the Local Government Act 1894, such districts were reconstituted as urban districts. The 1894 act also directed that civil parishes could no longer straddle district boundaries, and so the part of the old parish within the Hunstanton Urban District became a separate parish called New Hunstanton. In 1896 the Hunstanton Urban District was renamed New Hunstanton Urban District. The boundaries between the urban district and neighbouring parishes were adjusted in 1902, 1925, and 1928. In the 1928 boundary changes, most of the village of Old Hunstanton was transferred from Hunstanton parish into the New Hunstanton Urban District, leaving the Hunstanton parish primarily covering the estate of Hunstanton Hall.

In 1953 the neighbouring parish of Hunstanton was renamed Old Hunstanton, despite most of the village of that name being within the New Hunstanton Urban District. The following year, 1954, the urban district's name was changed back from New Hunstanton to just Hunstanton. Hunstanton Urban District was abolished in 1974 under the Local Government Act 1972. A successor parish called Hunstanton was created covering the area of the former urban district, with its parish council taking the name Hunstanton Town Council.

The boundary between Hunstanton and Old Hunstanton parishes was adjusted in 2007 to transfer the main part of Old Hunstanton village (which had been in Hunstanton parish) to the parish of Old Hunstanton.

== Demographics ==
Census population of Hunstanton parish
Census	Population	Female	Male	Households	Source
2001	5,008	2,773	2,235	2,428	
2011	4,229	2,307	1,922	2,093	
2021	4,370	2,342	2,028	2,263	

== Geology ==
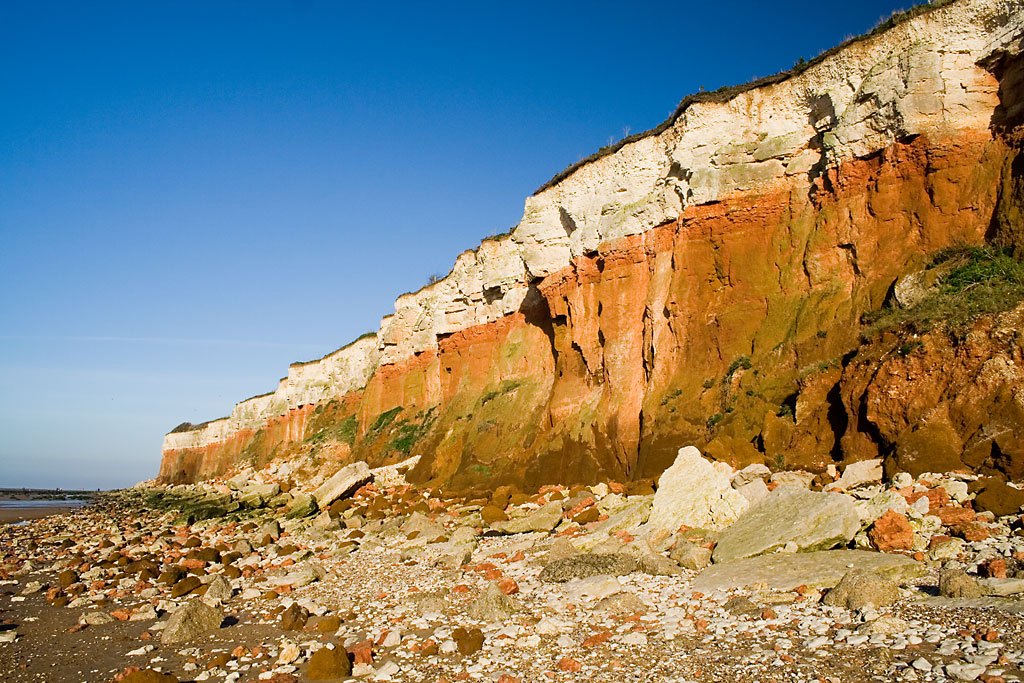
The stratified carrstone (orange), red chalk limestone and white chalk cliffs on the beach at Old Hunstanton

The coastal cliffs include the type section of the Hunstanton Formation of lower reddish limestone, which was laid down during the Lower Cretaceous. This is topped by a white chalk layer from the Upper Cretaceous period.

== Climate ==
Climate data for Hunstanton 28m asl, 1991-2020
Month	Jan	Feb	Mar	Apr	May	Jun	Jul	Aug	Sep	Oct	Nov	Dec	Year
Mean daily maximum °C (°F)	7.1 (44.8)	7.5 (45.5)	9.8 (49.6)	12.7 (54.9)	16.0 (60.8)	18.8 (65.8)	21.3 (70.3)	21.3 (70.3)	18.3 (64.9)	14.5 (58.1)	10.3 (50.5)	7.6 (45.7)	13.8 (56.8)
Daily mean °C (°F)	4.6 (40.3)	4.9 (40.8)	6.7 (44.1)	9.1 (48.4)	12.3 (54.1)	15.0 (59.0)	17.3 (63.1)	17.3 (63.1)	14.9 (58.8)	11.5 (52.7)	7.7 (45.9)	5.2 (41.4)	10.6 (51.1)
Mean daily minimum °C (°F)	2.2 (36.0)	2.3 (36.1)	3.6 (38.5)	5.6 (42.1)	8.6 (47.5)	11.2 (52.2)	13.4 (56.1)	13.4 (56.1)	11.4 (52.5)	8.5 (47.3)	5.2 (41.4)	2.8 (37.0)	7.4 (45.3)
Average precipitation mm (inches)	51.6 (2.03)	39.2 (1.54)	35.3 (1.39)	38.1 (1.50)	42.3 (1.67)	58.0 (2.28)	48.7 (1.92)	51.5 (2.03)	49.7 (1.96)	61.2 (2.41)	56.6 (2.23)	55.6 (2.19)	587.7 (23.14)
Average precipitation days (≥ 1.0 mm)	10.9	9.8	8.0	8.2	7.8	8.9	9.0	9.2	9.0	10.3	11.8	11.4	114.3
Mean monthly sunshine hours	60.0	81.7	120.7	177.6	197.6	187.2	202.4	188.6	147.7	112.4	68.0	60.3	1,604.2
Source: Met Office

== Tourism ==
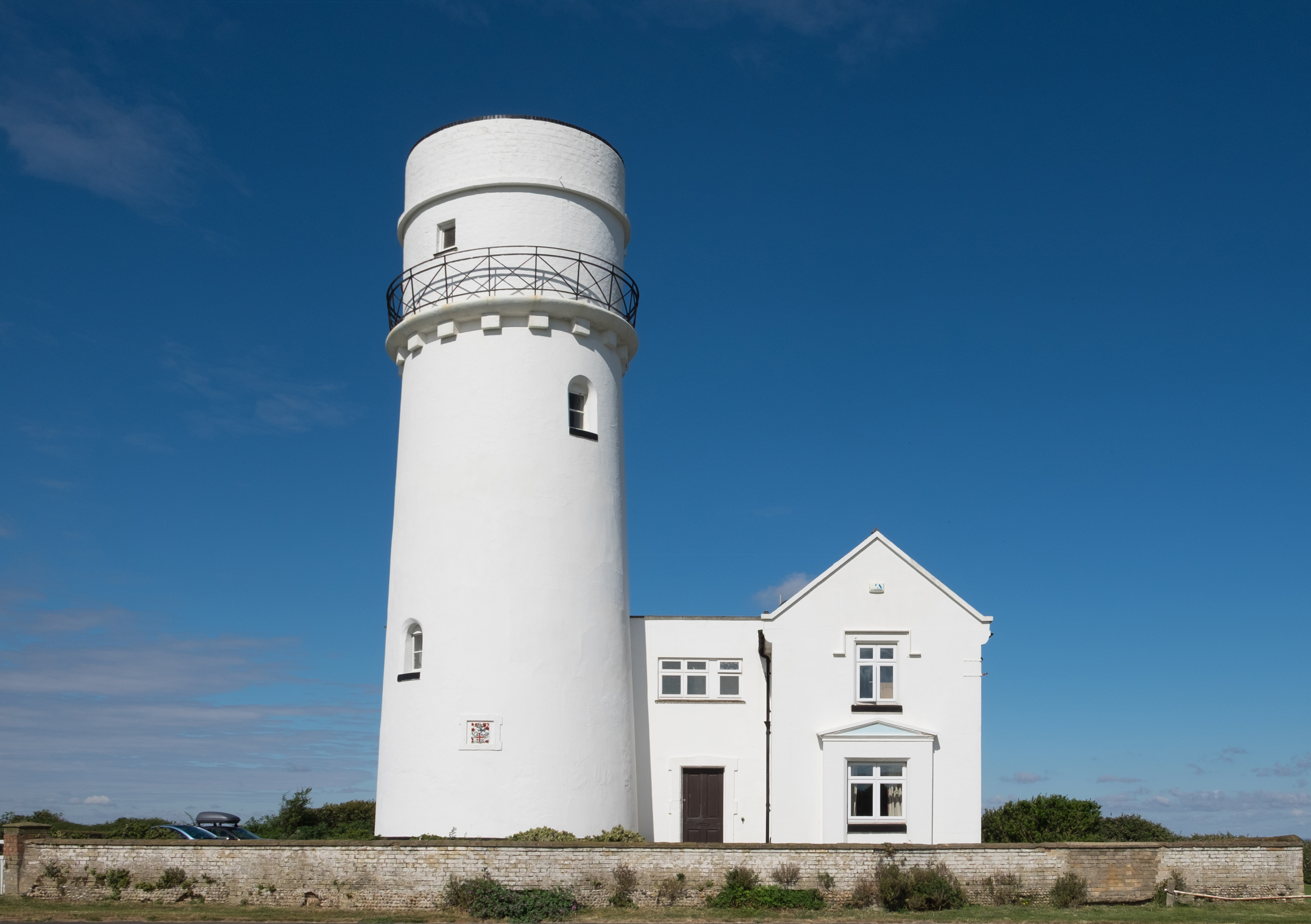
Former lighthouse in 2016

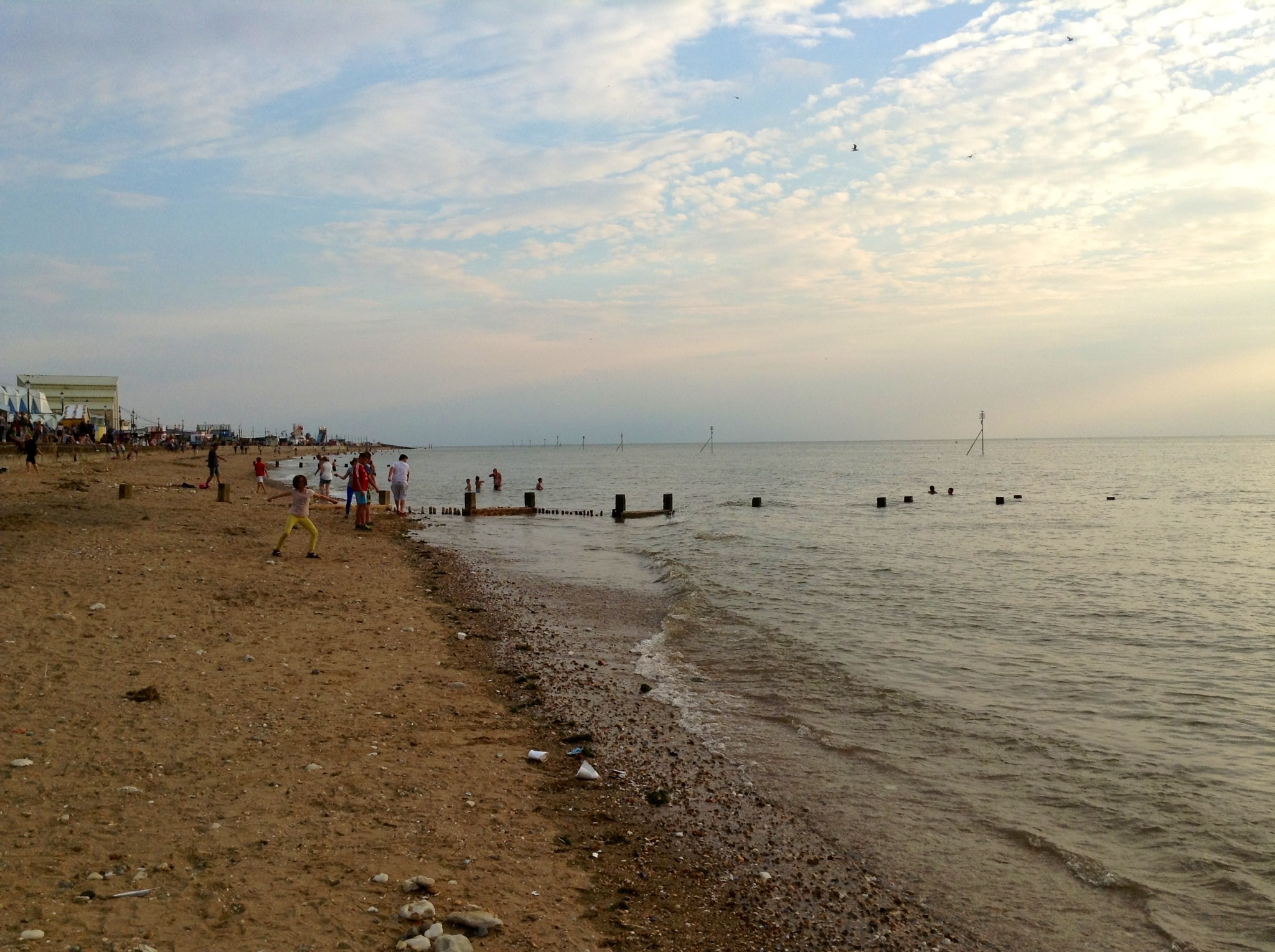
Hunstanton Beach at dusk, August 2013

Hunstanton's summer crowds are smaller than in the 1980s, although its relative popularity with day-trippers and holidaymakers has endured, despite the decline in British seaside holidaying. Businesses in villages south of Hunstanton (Dersingham, Ingoldisthorpe and Snettisham) complained in the 1990s of a loss in trade after being bypassed by the A149 to Hunstanton.

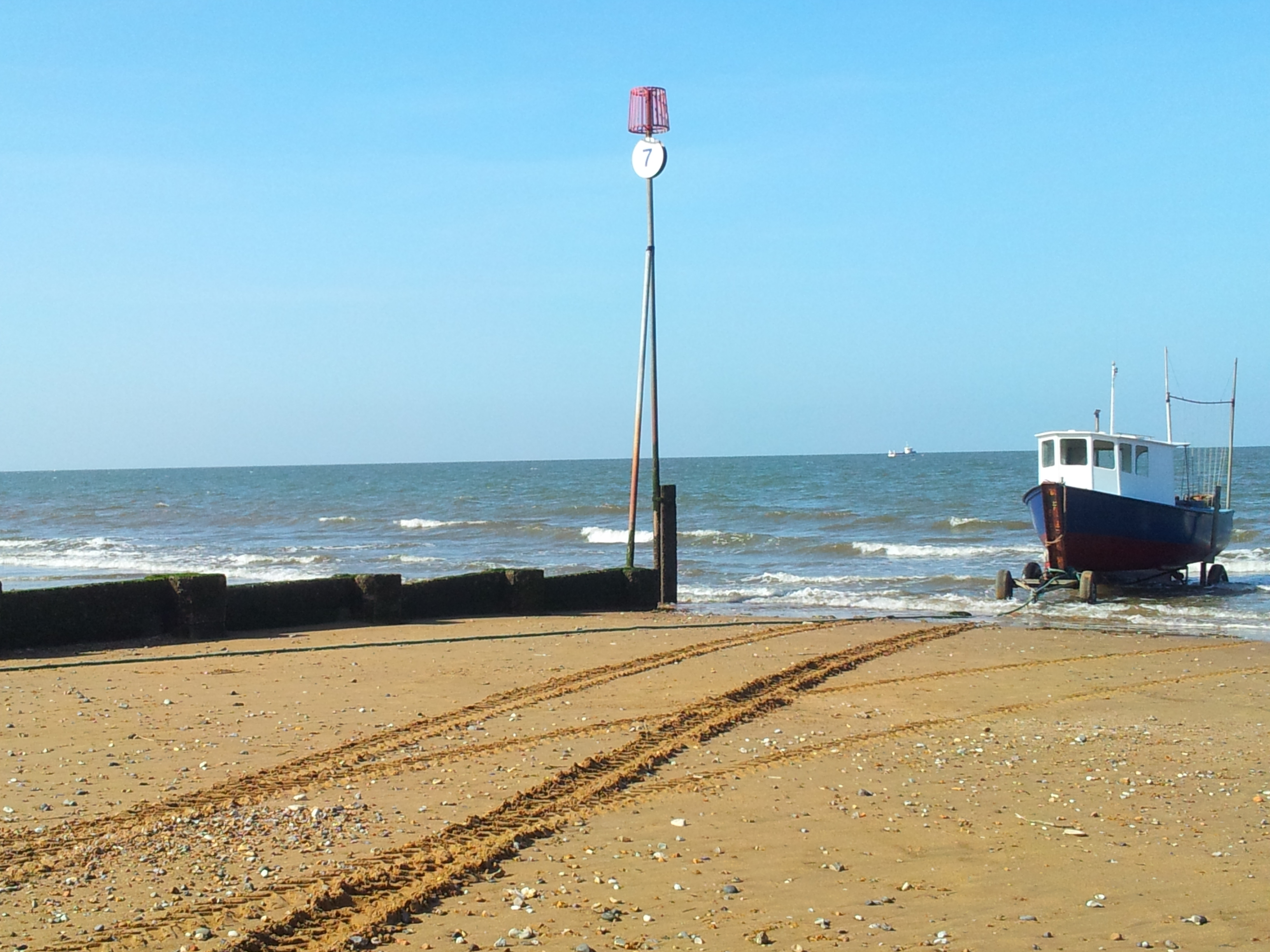
Looking out across The Wash from Hunstanton

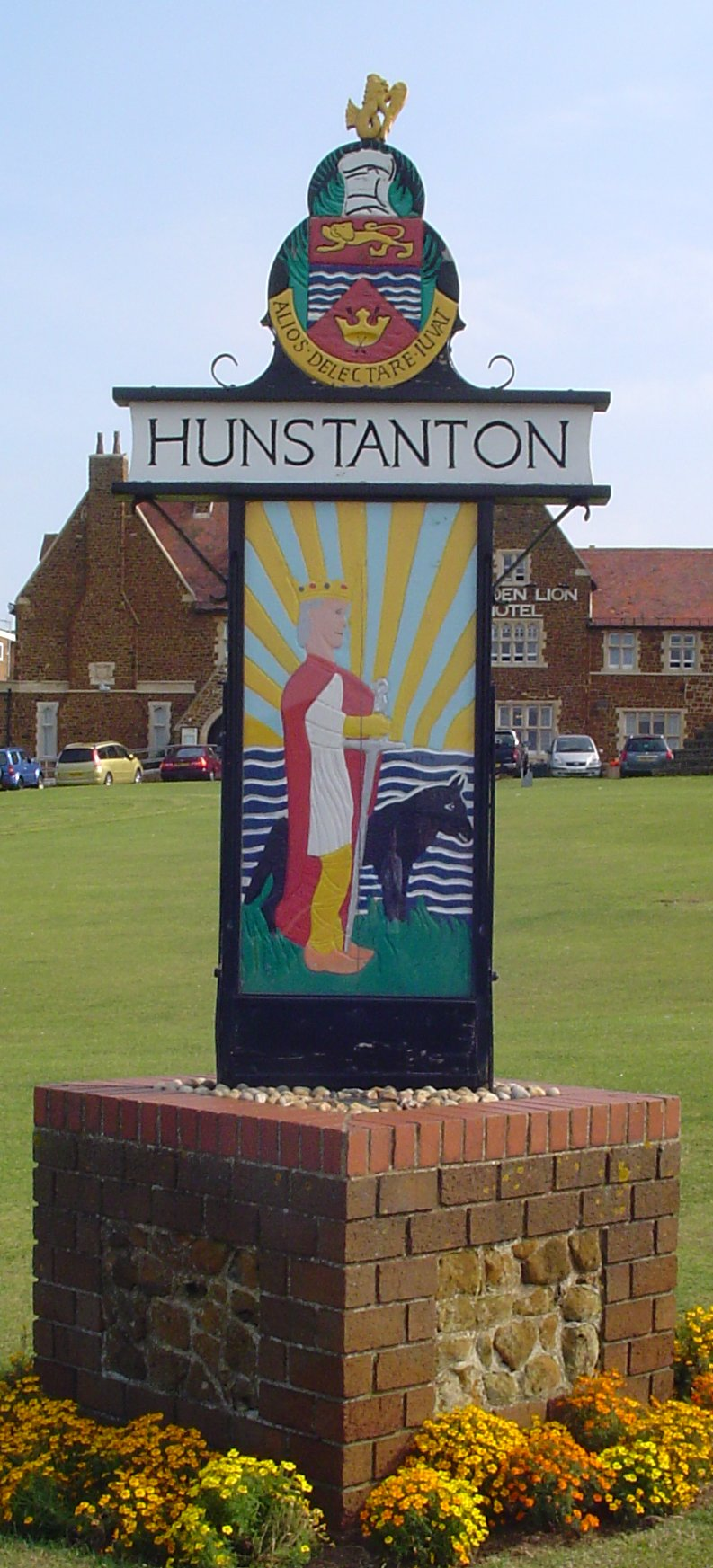
Place name sign in Hunstanton

The town has several Victorian squares. Boston Square provides a view across the Wash to Boston, Lincolnshire where both Boston Stump and the seaside town of Skegness are visible on clear days.

Hunstanton has a fairground, aquarium and seal sanctuary, leisure pool, theatre, large caravan parks with amenities, some amusement arcades, and a long promenade. The centrepiece remains the large sloping green from one end of High Street to the promenade.

Hunstanton has markets on Wednesdays and Sundays selling fresh fish, and fresh fruit and vegetables, which attract greater visitor numbers in the summer months through to the autumn. The main shopping streets feature stone buildings, some with glazed canopies, evoking the Victorian and Edwardian eras of their construction.

In good weather, excursion boats take visitors out to view grey and common seals that have colonised sand bars in the Wash and to the north of Norfolk. The countryside around Hunstanton is hillier than most of Norfolk and sparsely populated; the only large settlement nearby is King's Lynn, 12 miles (19 km) to the south.

== Hunstanton Pier ==
The town once had a Victorian pleasure pier, with a pavilion and miniature steam railway. The pier was originally authorised by the Hunstanton Pier Order 1868. The pier pavilion was destroyed by fire in 1939, the pier was damaged by fire again in the 1950s, before almost the entire structure was washed away by a storm in 1978. What remained extended just 15 feet out from the amusement arcade and cafe built on the site of the original entrance. In 2002, the entire building, with the remains of the pier, was destroyed in a fire. The building was too badly damaged for the cause to be determined. Today, the site is occupied by an arcade and bowling alley complex.

The pier featured in the 1957 Ealing Studios comedy film Barnacle Bill (released in the US as All at Sea) starring Alec Guinness.

== Transport ==
The town is linked to King's Lynn by a frequent Lynx bus service. Other services run to Sandringham, Wells-next-the-Sea, Sheringham and Cromer.

Hunstanton railway station offered services to King's Lynn until 1969, when the line was closed as uneconomic.

== Education ==
The Smithdon High School (formerly Hunstanton Secondary Modern School) is an early building designed by the architects Peter and Alison Smithson, built in 1949–1954 in a radical style of international architectural significance. It is a Grade II* listed building.

The school epitomised architectural experiment in post-war Britain and growing acceptance of modernism by public authorities. It was praised for an intelligent layout and formal elegance. The Smithsons deliberately left many of the service elements of the school exposed, making a feature of the water tank by turning it into a tower. The disposition, steel frames and panels of brick and glass echo the work of Mies van der Rohe at the Massachusetts Institute of Technology.

Hunstanton is home to Glebe House School, a private co-educational preparatory school.

== Culture ==
The Princess Theatre is a 472-seat, year-round venue for shows from comedy to drama, music for all tastes, and children's productions. It also has a six-week summer season and an annual Christmas pantomime. Films are screened in the week. Opened as the Capitol Cinema in 1932, it is noted for its Norfolk carrstone construction, of which it contains the largest gable wall in existence. It was designed as a theatre as well as a cinema, but closed in the 1960s and was sold in 1974. It reopened as the Kingsley Centre for summer seasons and films for about two years, but declined into a bingo hall before closing again. The Borough Council of King's Lynn and West Norfolk purchased it in 1981, and in honour of Lady Diana Spencer, who married the Prince of Wales in July 1981, it was renamed the Princess Theatre and officially re-opened on 5 July 1981.

Hunstanton Concert Band plays in and around Hunstanton at a wide variety of venues including churches, fêtes, concerts and the town's bandstand. The Deaf Havana album Fools and Worthless Liars featured a track called "Hunstanton Pier", a nostalgic recollection of the town where James Veck-Gilodi, its lead singer, grew up.

=== Literary associations ===
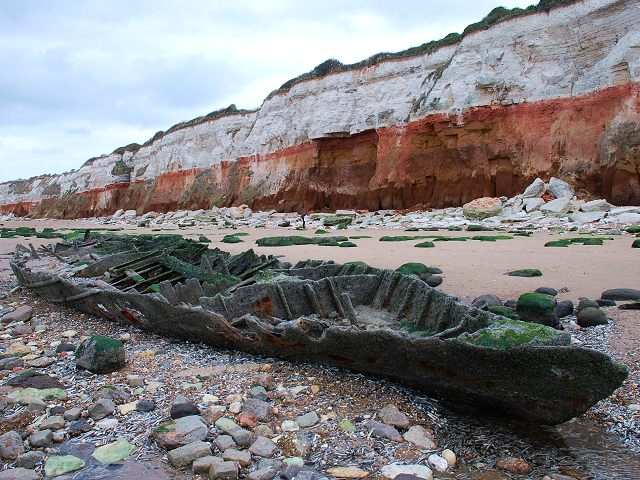
Wreck of the Sheraton

Between the world wars, P. G. Wodehouse often visited his friend Charles Le Strange at Hunstanton Hall. It influenced a number of locations in his comic novels, as Aunt Agatha's country seat Woollam Chersey and the inspiration for the setting for Money for Nothing (1928). The octagon in the garden featured in "Jeeves and the Impending Doom". Norfolk also furnishes names for many of Wodehouse's characters, such as Brancaster, Jack Snettisham and J. Sheringham Adair.

L. P. Hartley knew the Hunstanton neighbourhood from childhood holidays and used it as a setting for The Shrimp and the Anemone (1944), the first novel in his Eustace and Hilda trilogy. It is at Hunstanton Hall, fictionalised as Anchorstone Hall, that Eustace enters the privileged world of the aristocracy and eventually inherits a small fortune. The layered chalk, red chalk and carr-stone cliffs at Hunstanton provide a backdrop for Eustace and Hilda's games among the rock pools.

Patrick Hamilton's novel Hangover Square opens with George Harvey Bone walking on the cliffs in Hunstanton. Hamilton lived for many years at Martincross in Sheringham and spent time in the 1930s in a cottage in Burnham Overy Staithe, with his first wife, Lois.

== Media ==
Regional TV services are provided by BBC Yorkshire and Lincolnshire and ITV Yorkshire. Television signals are received from the Belmont TV transmitter. BBC East and ITV Anglia are also received through cable and satellite television such as Freesat and Sky.

Local radio stations are BBC Radio Norfolk, Heart East, Greatest Hits Radio West Norfolk (formerly KL.FM 96.7) Radio West Norfolk and KL1 Radio.

The town is served by these local newspapers:

- Lynn News
- Your Local Paper
- The Eastern Daily Press

== Sport ==
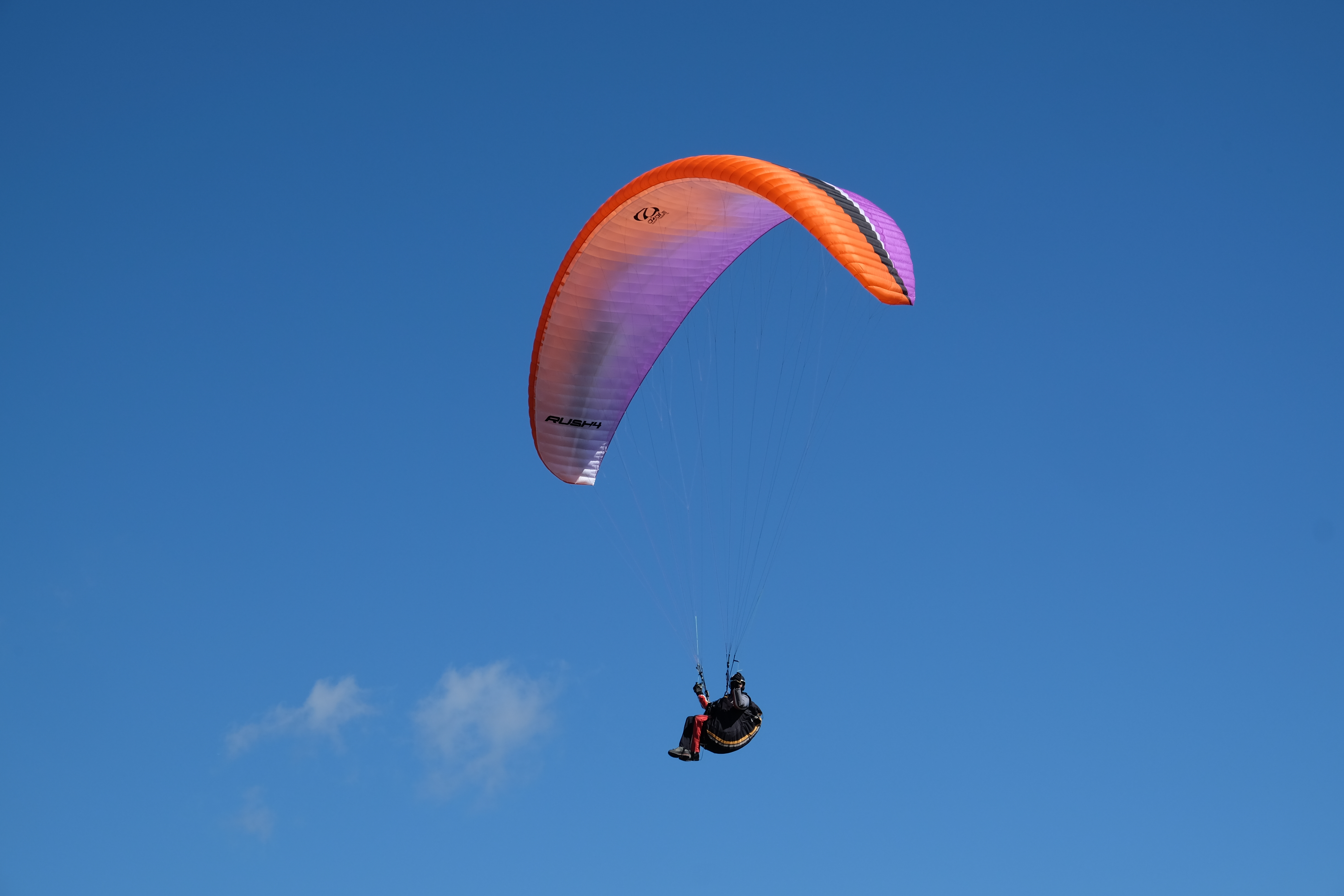
Paragliding above the cliffs in Hunstanton

The ITA Hunstanton lawn tennis tournament has taken place in Hunstanton most summers since establishment in 1920. With up to 1,300 competitors taking part each year its organisers claim that it the largest tennis tournament in the UK.

Hunstanton Golf Club, founded in 1891 by Hamon Le Strange, is an 18-hole championship links along the sandy coast of Old Hunstanton. It has a classic "out and back" design on either side of a central spine or dune ridge. The 12th, 13th and 14th holes play across the ridge.

The town has hosted several international sporting events, including the 2005 World Water Ski Racing Championships.

Lifestyles Festival was a summer sports festival held annually in Hunstanton from 2005 until 2014. It specialised in sporting events such as expert BMXing, in-line skating, and skateboarding, and Kite Surfing, along with cultural events including live music, visual arts, and dance. An estimated 12,000 people attended in 2010.

== Notable people ==
In birth order:

- Edmund the Martyr (died 869), King of East Anglia, supposedly landed here to claim his kingdom about 855.
- Sir Roger L'Estrange (1616–1704), Royalist and pamphleteer, was born here.
- Guy Le Strange (1854–1933), Middle East scholar and linguist, was born here.
- George Grundy (1859–1945), first-class cricketer, died here.
- Tiverton Preedy (1863–1928), Anglican cleric and sports promoter, was born here.
- Clara Dow (1883–1969), operatic soprano and actress, made her stage début here in 1899.
- Robert Herring (1897–1973), an officer in the London Regiment, a flying ace in the Royal Flying Corps, and the Royal Air Force during both World Wars, born here. Recipient of the Military Cross
- Reis Leming (1930–2012), US airman, received the UK George Medal for rescuing 27 people from South Beach during the North Sea flood of 1953.
- Richard Greer (born 1946), motorcycle speedway rider in the 1970s and 1980s, lives here.
- Bill Alexander (born 1948), theatre director, was born here.

== Arms ==
Coat of arms of Hunstanton Town Council

Notes
Granted 9 September 1955.
Crest
On a wreath of the colours a sea lion Or supporting an ostrich feather erect Argent.
Escutcheon
Barry wavy Argent and Azure on a pile reversed Gules two arrows in saltire points downwards enfiled with a coronet of four fleurs-de-lys set upon a rim Or on a chief also Gules a lion passant of the first.
Motto
Alios Delectare Juvat (It Is Our Pleasure To Please Others).
