= Henry L'Estrange Styleman Le Strange =

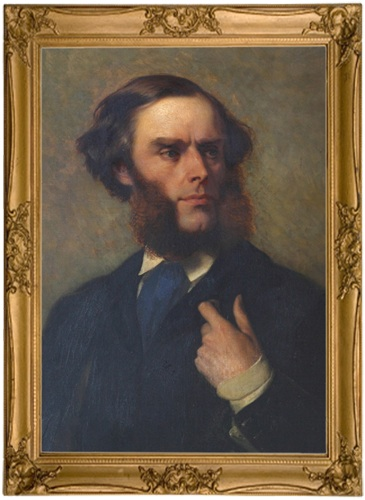
Henry Styleman Le Strange

Henry L'Estrange Styleman Le Strange (1815–1862), in early life Henry Styleman, was an English decorative painter. He is now remembered as the developer of the town of Hunstanton, Norfolk, as a coastal resort.

== Life ==
Born on 25 January 1815, he was the only son of Henry Styleman of Snettisham and Hunstanton, Norfolk, and his wife Emilia, daughter of Benjamin Preedy; his father was grandson of Nicholas Styleman, who married Armine, elder daughter of Sir Nicholas L'Estrange, 4th Baronet, an heiress. He was educated at Eton College, from where he matriculated in 1832, and then at Christ Church, Oxford, from where he graduated B.A. in 1837 (awarded M.A in 1852). On leaving Oxford he travelled in Portugal, Spain, and Egypt.

In 1839 Styleman assumed by royal licence the additional family name of Le Strange, on inheriting the Hunstanton Hall estate. In 1839 also he was declared by the House of Lords co-heir of the barony of Camoys, and in 1841 co-heir to the barony of Hastings. In 1847 he made an unsuccessful attempt to enter Parliament for West Norfolk.

Styleman Le Strange died suddenly of heart disease in London on 27 July 1862, and was buried at Hunstanton.

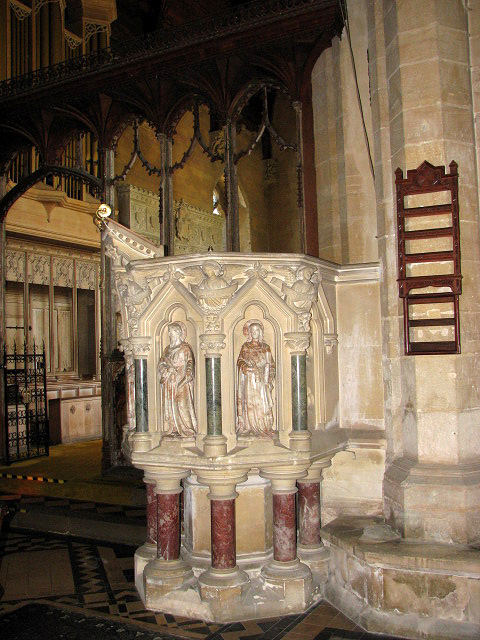
Memorial pulpit to Henry L'Estrange Styleman Le Strange in St Mary's Church, Hunstanton

== Works ==
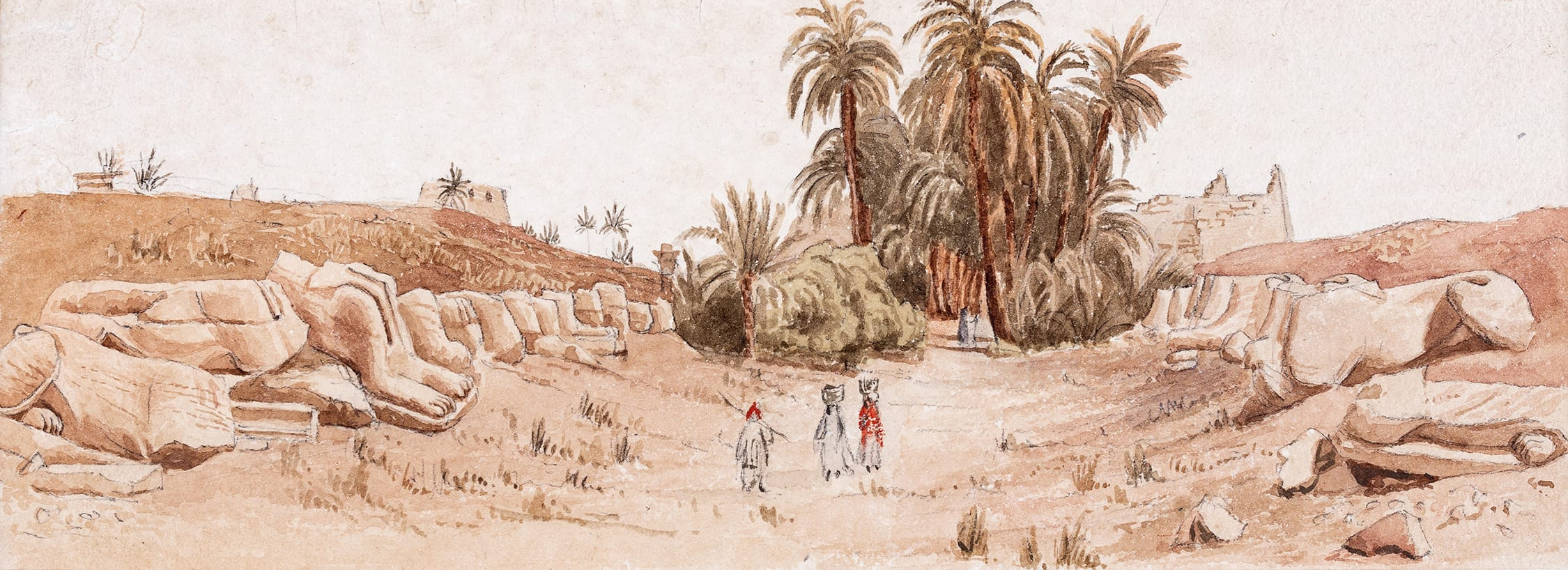
Avenue of Sphinxes leading to Great Pylon at Karnak (watercolour; 1839) by Le Strange

Styleman le Strange was an amateur artist. In 1853 he drew a design for the decoration of the tower of Ely Cathedral, which was accepted in 1854, and completed by him in 1855. In July 1856 he was invited by the cathedral chapter to design decoration for the roof of the nave. He began painting the roof in 1858, and worked on it for four years.

In 1860 Styleman le Strange was invited to co-operate with William Butterfield the architect, in the decoration of St Alban's Church, Holborn, and took two years over the design work. After his death, the roof in Ely Cathedral was completed by Thomas Gambier Parry, and the designs for St Alban's were carried out by Frederick Preedy, a cousin.

== Family ==
In 1839 Styleman Le Strange married Jamesina Joyce Ellen, daughter of John Stewart of Belladrum, Inverness-shire. He left three sons, including Guy Le Strange, and three daughters, of whom Alice married Laurence Oliphant.
