= River Hun =

River in west Norfolk, England

Hun
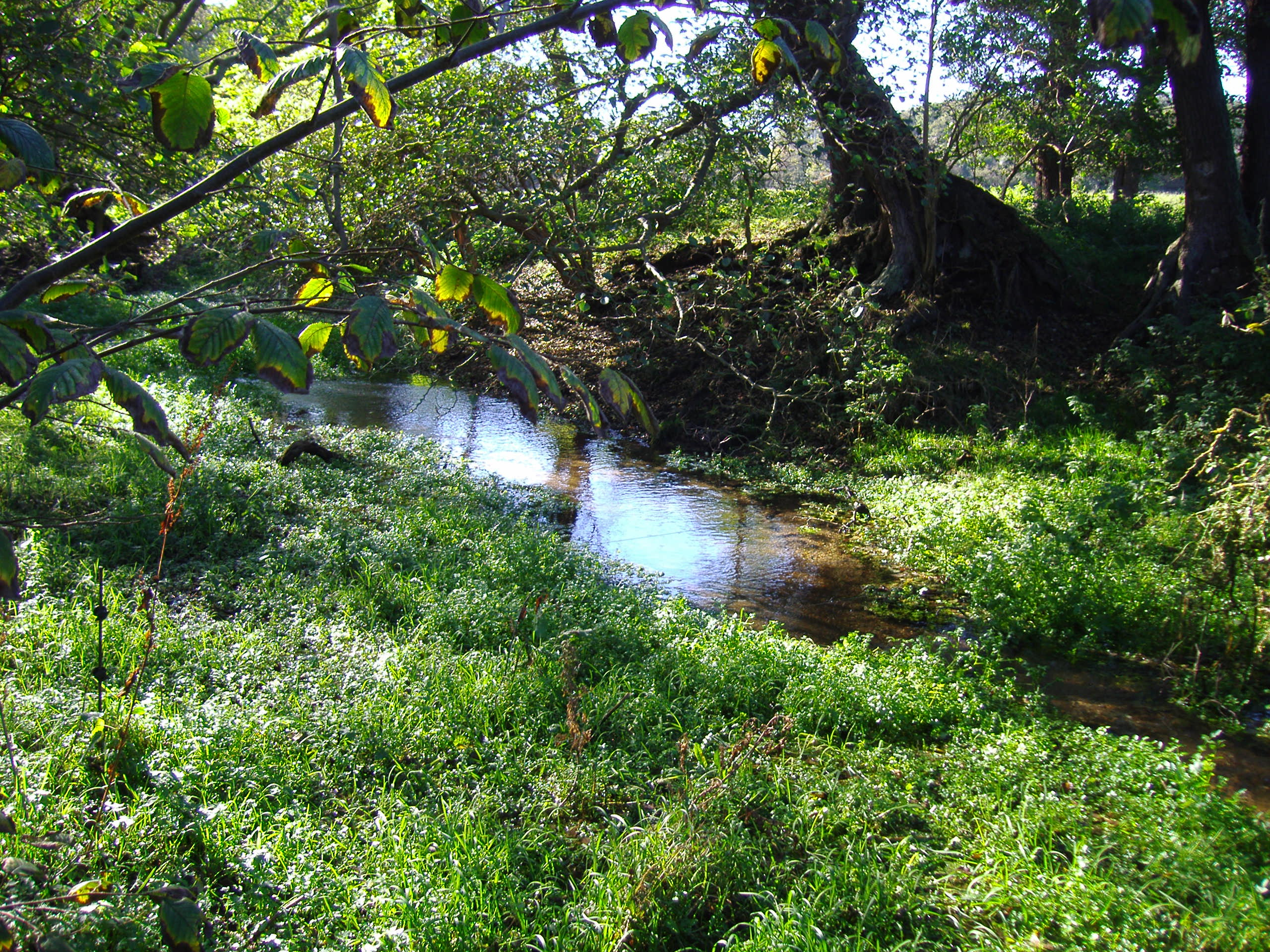
- River Hun close to Hunstanton Park

- Location of the river mouth within Norfolk

Location
- Country: England
- State: Norfolk
- Region: East of England
- District: North West Norfolk

Physical characteristics
- Source: Hunstanton Park
  - coordinates: 52.9378°N 0.5192°E
  - elevation: 9 m (30 ft)
- Mouth: North Sea
  - location: Holme Next The Sea
  - coordinates: 52°58′19″N 0°33′39″E
  - elevation: 0 m (0 ft)
- Length: 3.9 mi (6.3 km)

The River Hun is a chalk stream in the west of the county of Norfolk, in England. Its source is in the grounds of Hunstanton Park. Its mouth can be found on the North Sea near Holme-next-the-Sea.

In the 11th century it was known as 'Esten broke' (i.e. Esten brook).

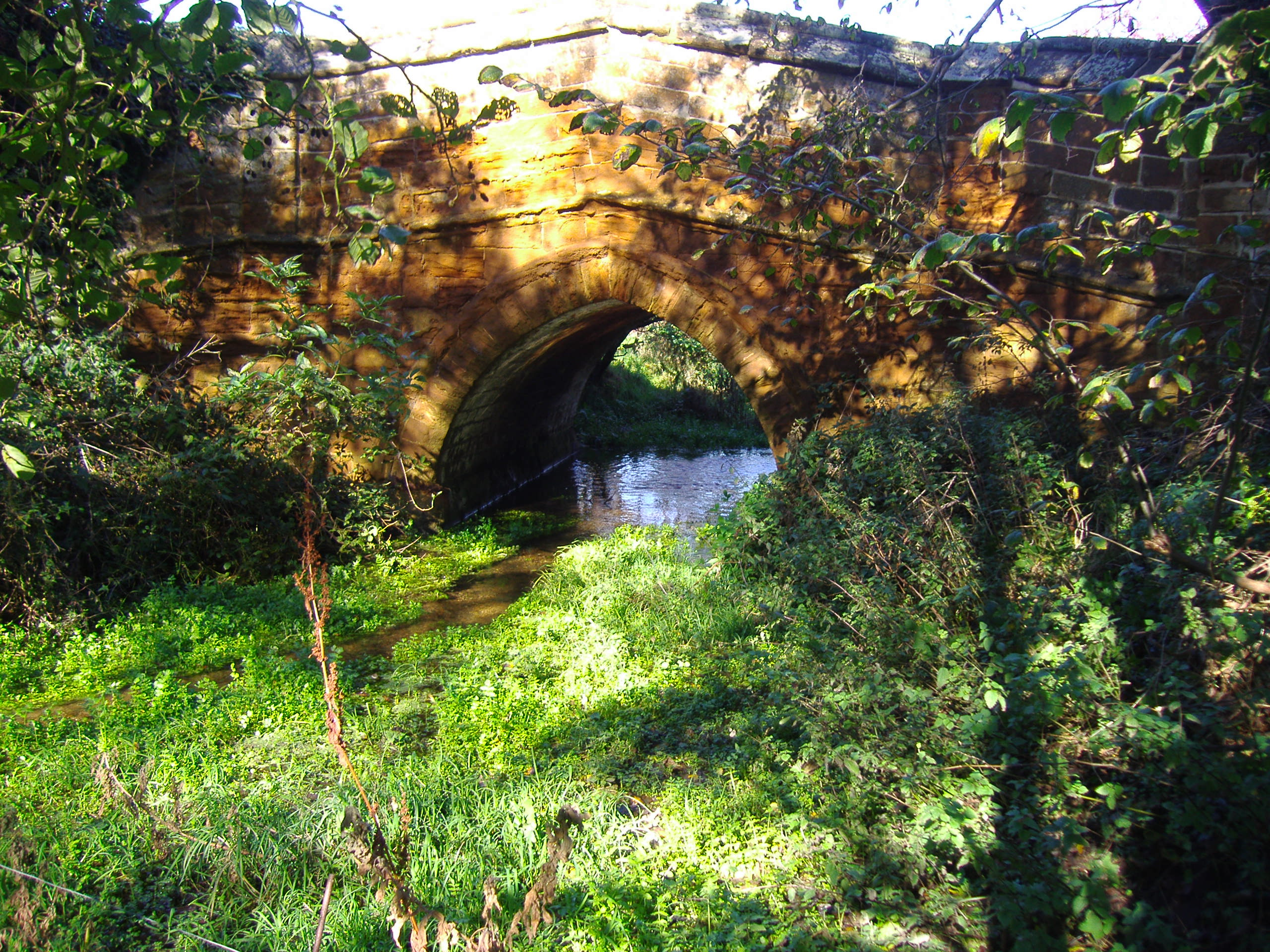
The River Hun at the point it flows under the A149 Coast Road
