= Drue Drury =

Drue Drury may refer to:

- Sir Drue Drury (courtier) (?1531–1617)
- Sir Drue Drury, 1st Baronet (1588–1632), MP for Thetford and Norfolk
- Sir Drue Drury, 2nd Baronet (1611–1647), of the Drury baronets

== See also ==
- Dru Drury (1725–1804), British entomologist
