= Sir Nicholas L'Estrange, 1st Baronet =

English baronet and collector of anecdotes

Sir Nicholas L'Estrange, 1st Baronet (March 1604 – 24 July 1655) was an English baronet and collector of anecdotes.

== Biography ==
L'Estrange was the third but eldest surviving son of Sir Hamon le Strange and Alice Stubbe. He was raised at Hunstanton Hall before attending Trinity College, Cambridge in 1622. Two years later he was admitted to Lincoln's Inn. In 1629, his father purchased a baronetcy in the Baronetage of England for him at a cost of £300, plus £100 in charges. On 26 August 1630 he married Anne (1612–1663), daughter of Sir Edward Lewkenor of Denham, West Suffolk. They had eight sons and three daughters.

L'Estrange shared the Royalist views of his family, but there is no record of him taking an active part in the English Civil War. He declined to attend an October 1642 meeting of militia commanders in Norwich summoned by the Roundhead authorities. Following this, the Norfolk parliamentary commanders ordered that his house should be searched and any arms removed. He managed to avoid the seizure of his estates under the Commonwealth of England and died on 24 July 1655 at Hunstanton, where he was buried. He was succeeded in his title by his son, Hamon.

=== Collector of anecdotes ===
L'Estrange played an active role in Norfolk society as a senior member of the county's gentry and was often present at the assizes and parliamentary elections at Norwich, as well as taking part in hunts and hawking sessions. He was an avid observer and recorder of these interactions, and collected over 600 anecdotes which were published anonymously in Merry Passages and Jests. Many of the anecdotes were so coarse that when the collection was republished by the Camden Society as Anecdotes and Traditions in 1839, only 141 were deemed suitable to be printed.

The attributions reveal his connections across East Anglian society, including observations on figures such as Sir Drue Drury, Clement Spelman, Sir John Hobart, Miles Hobart, and his relations Hamon L'Estrange, Roger L'Estrange and Sir William Spring. The anecdotes present an unparalleled view of provincial life during the period and of the interaction between members of the gentry, as well as of the gossip of the taverns.

Baronetage of England
New title	Baronet (of Hunstanton); 1629–1655	Succeeded by Hamon L'Estrange
