= Henry Bedingfield (MP for Norfolk) =

English courtier (1581/2–1657)

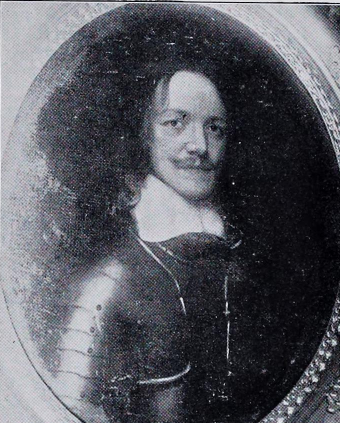
Sir Henry Bedingfield (1586–1657), c.1645

Sir Henry Bedingfield (21 May 1586 – 22 November 1657), of Oxburgh Hall, Norfolk, was an English Member of Parliament.

== Life ==
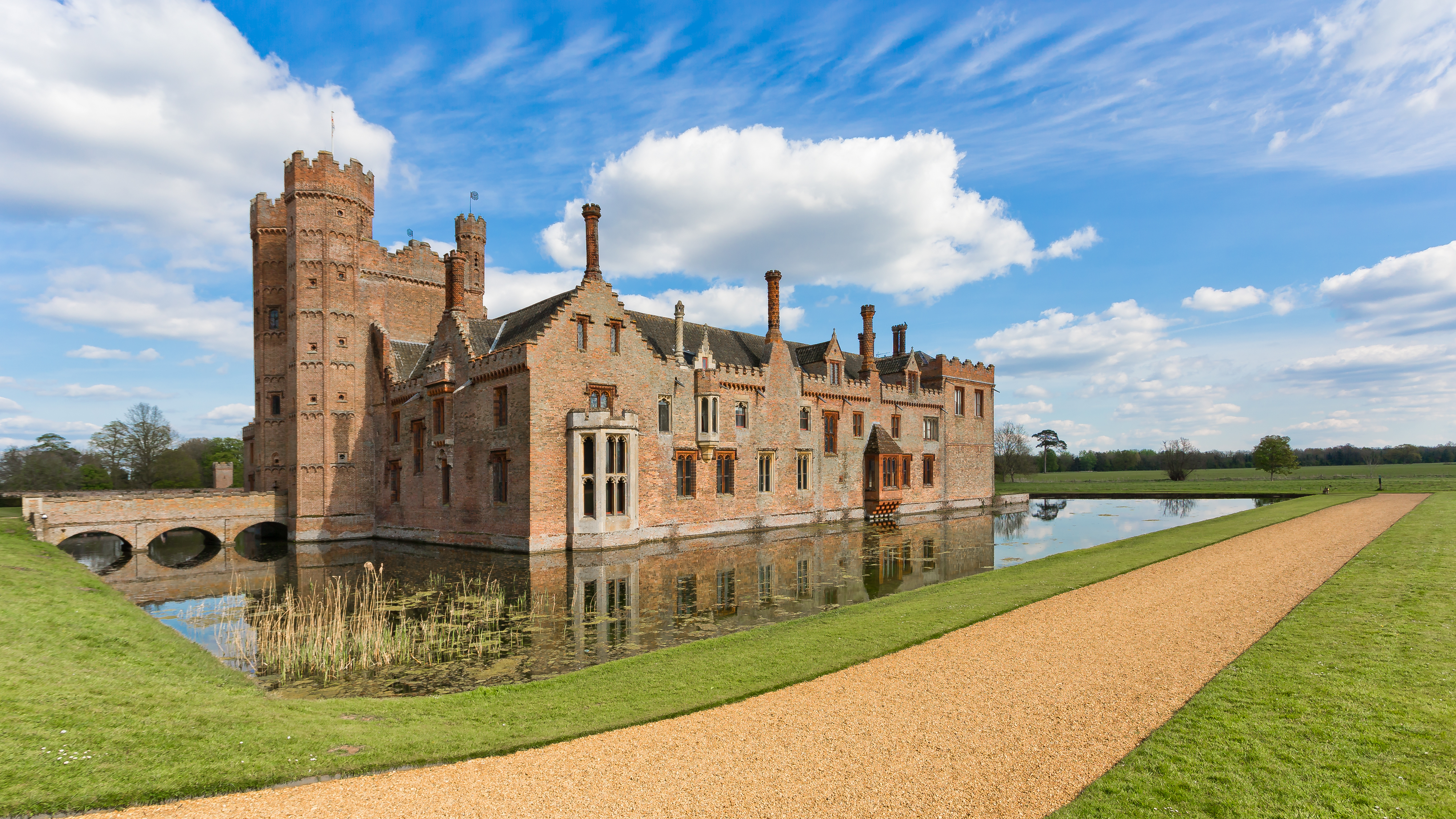
Oxburgh Hall

Bedingfield born on 21 May 1586, the eldest son of Thomas Bedingfield of Oxburgh and Frances, daughter and coheiress of John Jernegan of Somerleyton. After his father's death in 1590, his mother married Henry Jerningham, of Cossey, the father of the first Jerningham baronet.

Henry Bedingfield was knighted some time after 21 July 1604. He was a Member (MP) of the Parliament of England for Norfolk in 1614. He was the Sheriff of Norfolk in 1620–1621.

Bedingfield was accused, with some justification, of being a Catholic recusant and led a Royalist contingent of East Anglian Catholics during the Civil War. He escaped to Holland shortly after the queen left England in early 1642. Returning from exile under pressure in 1646 he was committed to the Tower of London in 1647, being released under a general pardon in 1649. His Norfolk estates, excluding Oxburgh, were confiscated and sold.

== Family ==
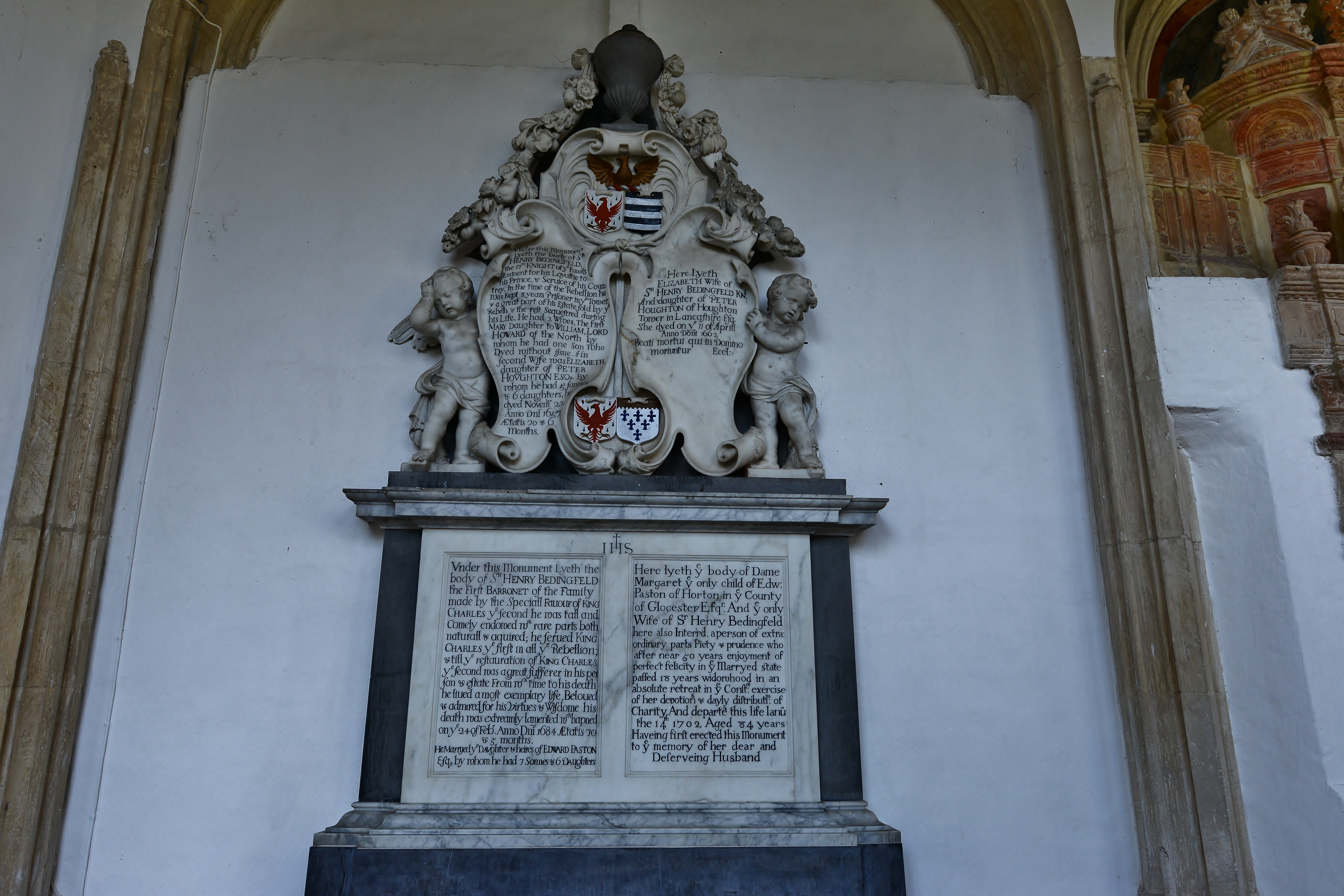
Monument in the Bedingfield Chapel in the church of St. John the Evangelist, Oxborough

Bedingfield married first Mary, daughter of William Howard of Naworth; and second Elizabeth (1590 – 11 April 1662), daughter and coheiress of Peter Houghton of Houghton Towers in Lancashire, Esquire, Alderman and Sheriff of London. His second wife died 11 April 1662, and is buried at Oxburgh.

Bedingfield and Mary Howard had a son, Thomas Bedingfield of Oxborough, who died without heirs during his father's lifetime.

Bedingfield and Elizabeth Houghton had the following children:

- Sir Henry Bedingfield, 1st Baronet. He succeeded his half-brother, was created a baronet in 1660, and died 24 February 1684.
- Edmund Bedingfield (d.1666+), a Canon at Lierre Brabant, where he died
- William Bedingfield, Captain in the Guards, died before 16 February 1685
- John, son, died 1685
- Jane, married Colonel Robert Apreece, of Huntshire
- Frances, married Michael Tymperley of Hintlesham
- Mary, married Thomas Eyre of Hassop in Derbyshire
- Elizabeth, married Colonel William Cobbe, of Sandringham
- Anne, married Richard Martyn of Long Melford

Bedingfield's eldest son, Thomas, also fought as a Royalist and after being captured at Lincoln served two years in gaol before being exiled, and his son-in-law, Colonel Robert Apreece, was killed after the Parliamentarians captured Lincoln in 1643. Two other sons, Henry and William, both fought as royalists and escaped overseas and another son, Edmund, was a canon at Lierre in Belgium. After the Restoration of the Monarchy in 1660, Henry, who had inherited Oxburgh Hall, was created a baronet to recompense him for the family's losses during the Civil war.

Parliament of England
| Preceded by Nathaniel Bacon; Charles Cornwallis | Member of Parliament for Norfolk; 1614; With: Hamon le Strange | Succeeded by Drue Drury; Hamon le Strange |
