= Alice L'Estrange =

Alice Le Strange
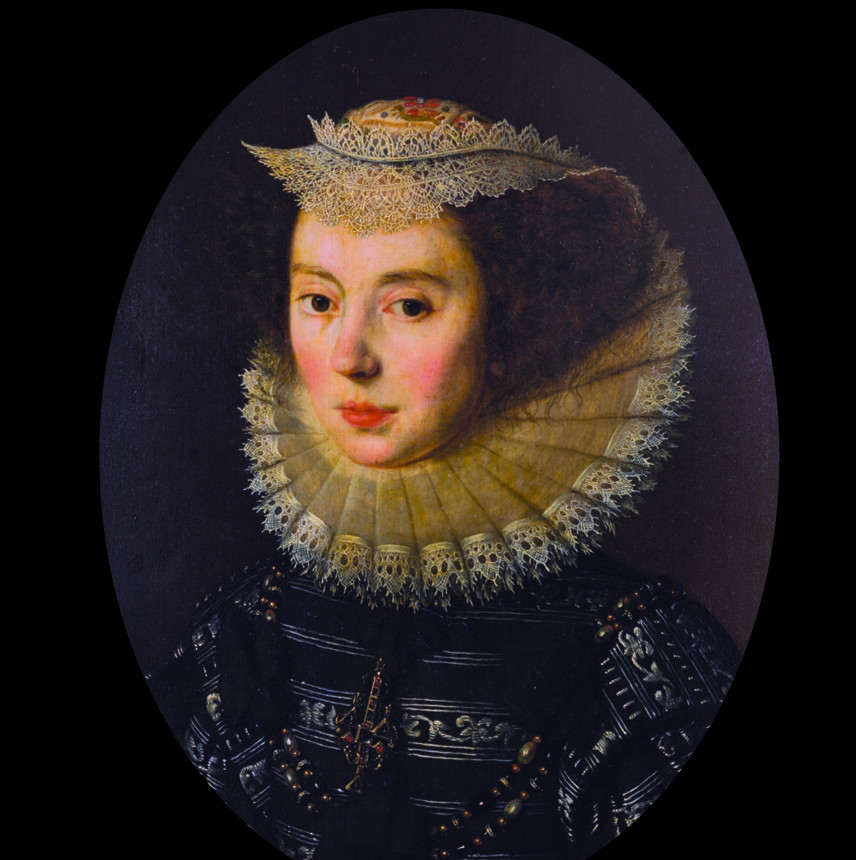
- Alice L'Estrange (detail) by John Hoskins (Private Collection, UK)
- Born: 1585
- Died: 1656 (aged 70–71); Hunstanton Hall, Norfolk
- Known for: keeping accounts

Alice L'Estrange or Alice Le Strange born Alice Stubbe (1585 – 1656) was an English keeper of household and estate accounts at Hunstanton Hall in Old Hunstanton.

== Life ==
L'Estrange was born to Richard and Anne Stubbe. Richard was a lawyer and Anne was his second wife. Richard already had a daughter and Alice was his second. Both daughters inherited fortunes but Alice's fortune was notably less. We know this because Alice was a devoted keeper of financial accounts. Alice's marriage to Hamon L'Estrange seems to have been arranged by her father who was the lawyer to the L'Estrange family and Sir John Peyton who was her husband's guardian. Peyton received £1000 from Richard Stubbes and Alice was given some landholdings and £100 per annum from her guardian.

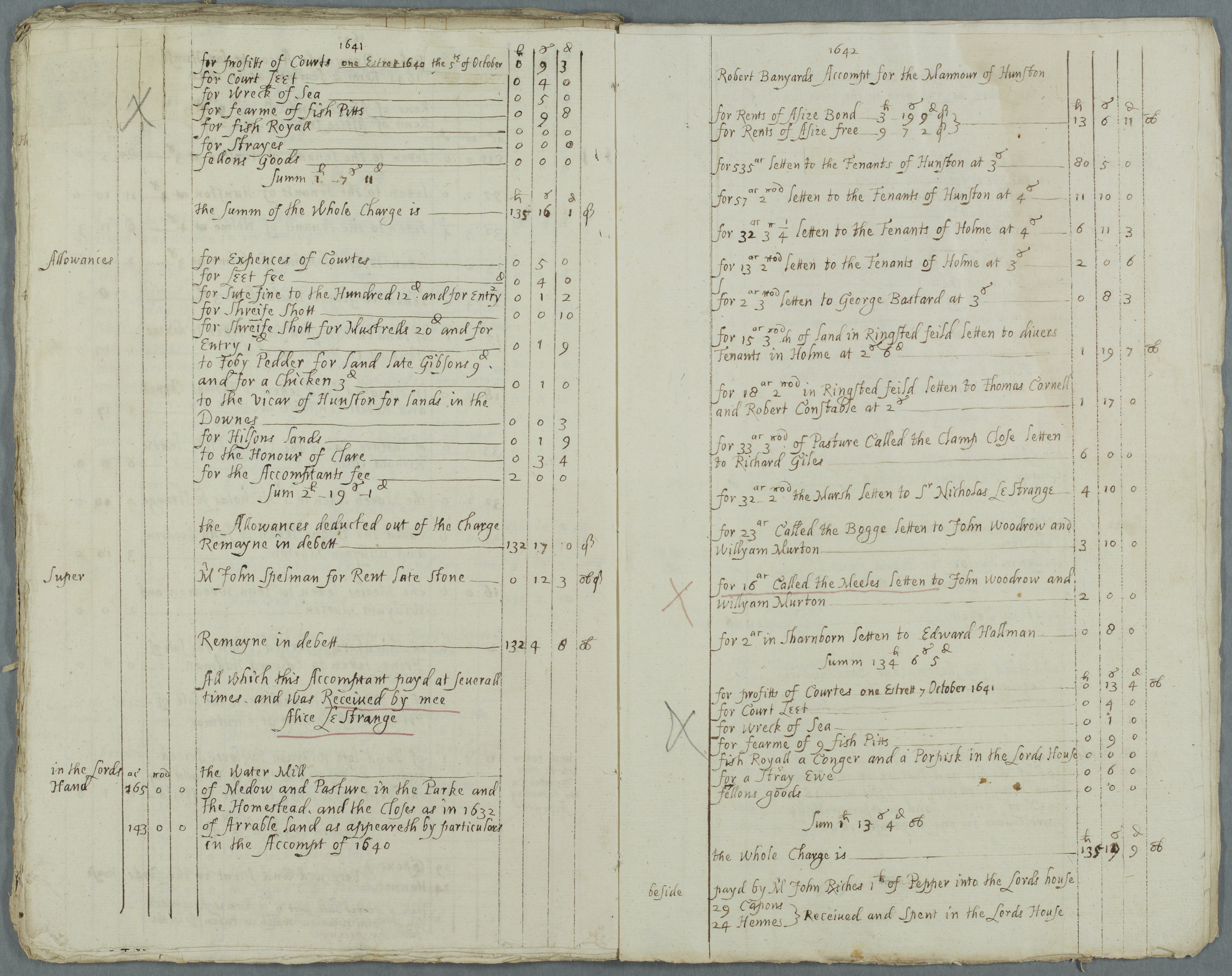
Alice L'Estrange's rental agreement - prepared by and signed by her

In 1621 her husband was again the member of parliament and this time he took Alice on her only journey to London. She meticulously recorded that their expenses and her shopping trips cost the enormous sum of £163.

In 1643 her husband as a committed Royalist was made governor of King's Lynn during the English Civil War. The honour was short-lived as the town was besieged and when it surrendered their family had to pay over £1000 in compensation. Other bills accrued and his enemies arranged that their lands were forfeit between 1649 and 1651.

L'Estrange died in Hunstanton Hall. Her accounts and records edited by Elizabeth Griffiths were published by the Norfolk Record Society.

== Personal ==
She and her husband had eight children of whom four lived to be adults. Their son Hamon was a writer on history, theology and liturgy. Another son Roger was a religious pamphleteer, while a third, Nicholas, became a baronet. Her daughter, Elizabeth, married the Parliamentarian politician Sir William Spring.
