= Edmund Sawyer =

Edmund Sawyer may refer to:

- Edmund Sawyer (historian)
- Edmund Sawyer (MP)
