= Nicholas Strange =

Nicholas Strange may refer to:

- Nicholas Strange (MP)
- Nicholas Strange (rower)
