= L'Estrange baronets =

Extinct baronetcy in the Baronetage of England

The L'Estrange Baronetcy, of Hunstanton in the County of Norfolk, was a title in the Baronetage of England. It was created on 1 June 1629 for Nicholas L'Estrange, son of Hamon le Strange. The fourth Baronet sat as Member of Parliament for Castle Rising. The title became extinct on the death of the seventh Baronet in 1762.

Hamon L'Estrange and Roger L'Estrange were the younger brothers of the first Baronet.

== L'Estrange baronets, of Hunstanton (1629) ==
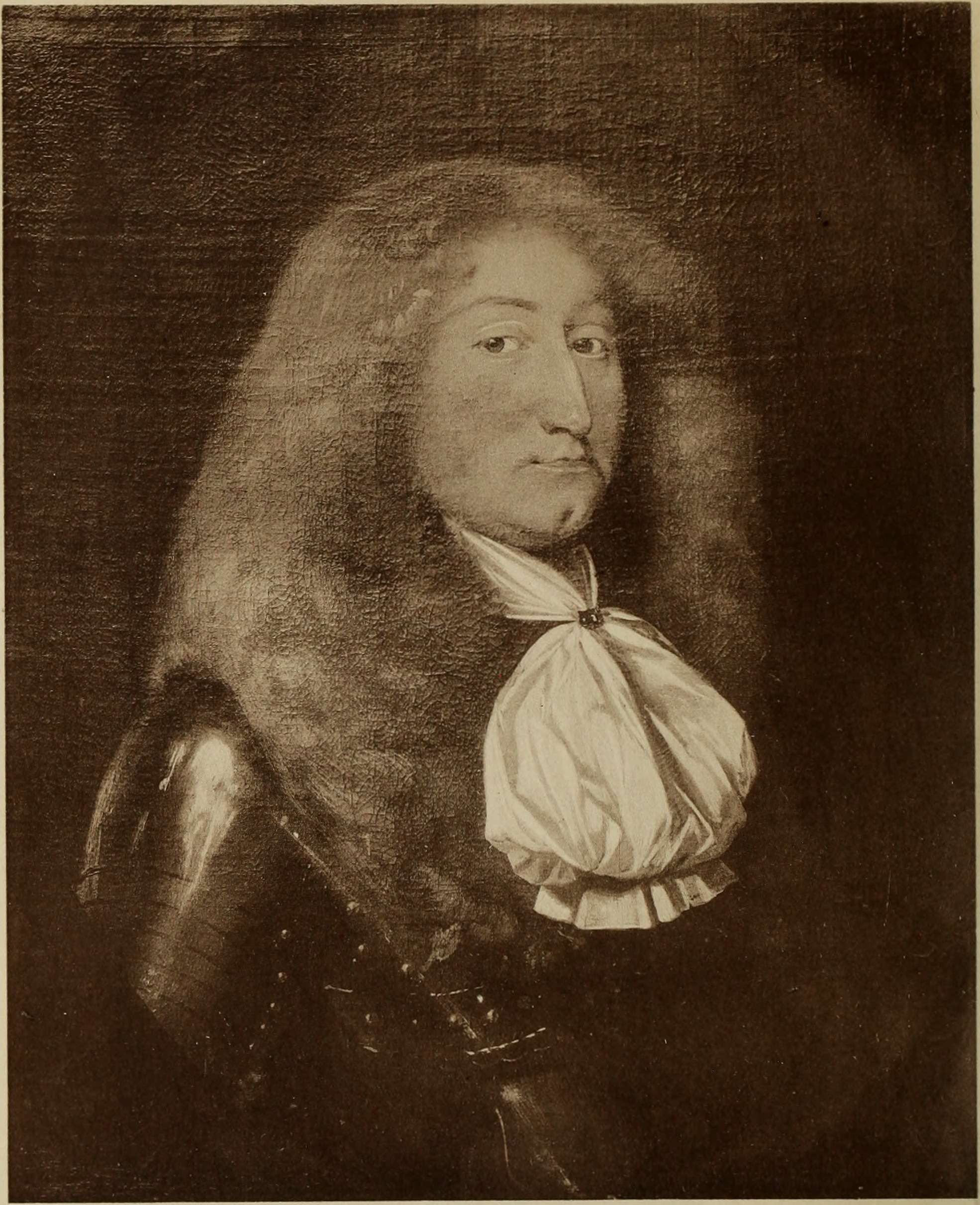
Sir Nicholas L'Estrange, 3rd Baronet (1632–1669)

- Sir Nicholas L'Estrange, 1st Baronet (1604–1655)
- Sir Hamon L'Estrange, 2nd Baronet (1631–1656)
- Sir Nicholas L'Estrange, 3rd Baronet (1632–1669)
- Sir Nicholas L'Estrange, 4th Baronet (1661–1724)
- Sir Thomas L'Estrange, 5th Baronet (1689–1751)
- Sir Henry L'Estrange, 6th Baronet (1698–1760)
- Sir Roger L'Estrange, 7th Baronet (1682–1762)
