= The Observator =

UK newspaper

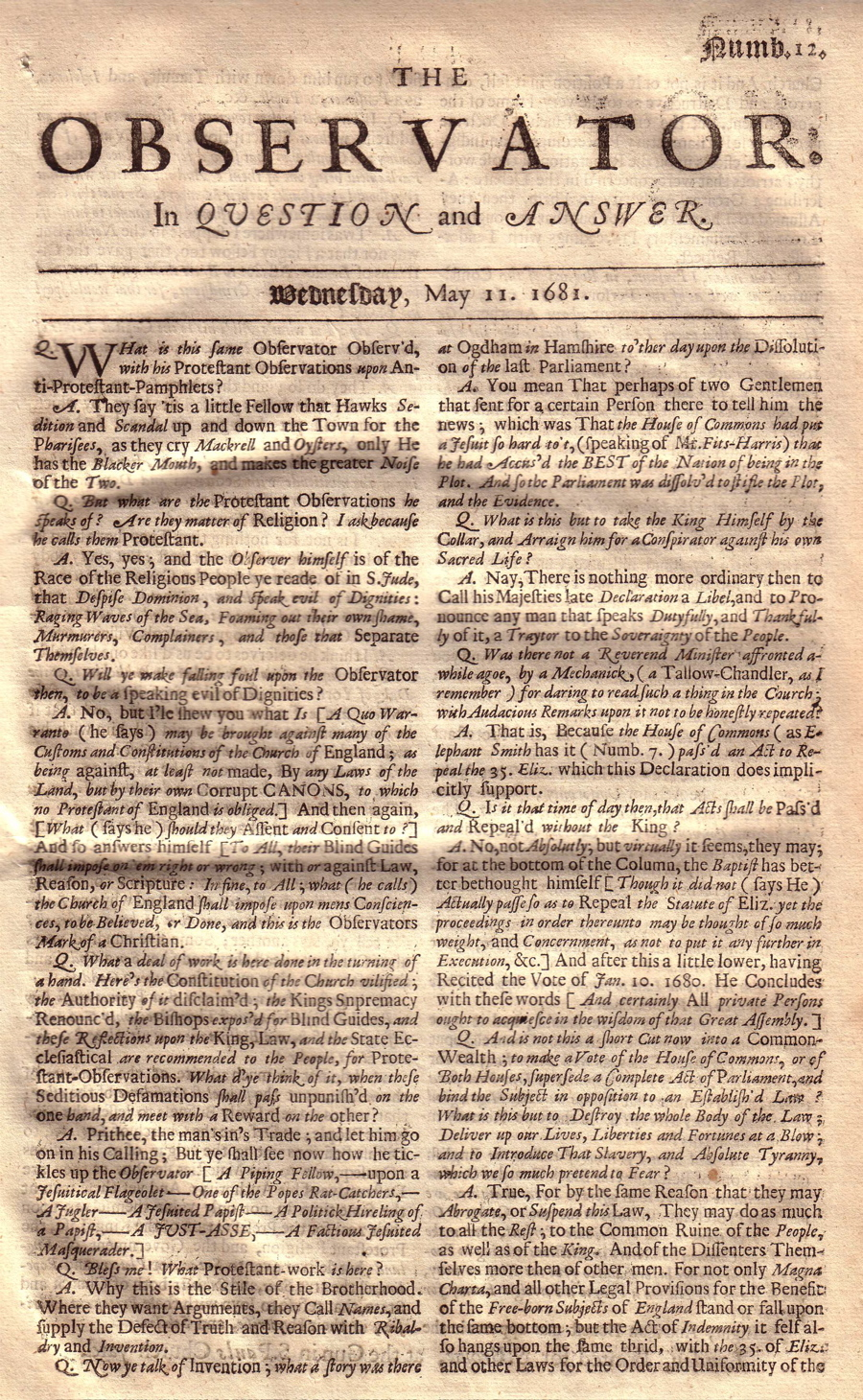
- The Observator, May 11, 1681.
- Type: English Renaissance Newspaper
- Format: Tabloid
- Owner: Roger L'Estrange
- Founded: 1681
- Political alignment: anti-whig
- Headquarters: London

The Observator was a newspaper written in the form of a dialogue by Roger L'Estrange, and published from April 13, 1681, to March 9, 1687.

L'Estrange was a defender of the Monarchy, and promoted his anti-whig agenda through The Observator.

Most issues were printed by the Brome family in London, England, at the "Gun in S. Pauls Church-yard".
