= Sir Thomas Drury, 1st Baronet =

English politician (1712–1759)

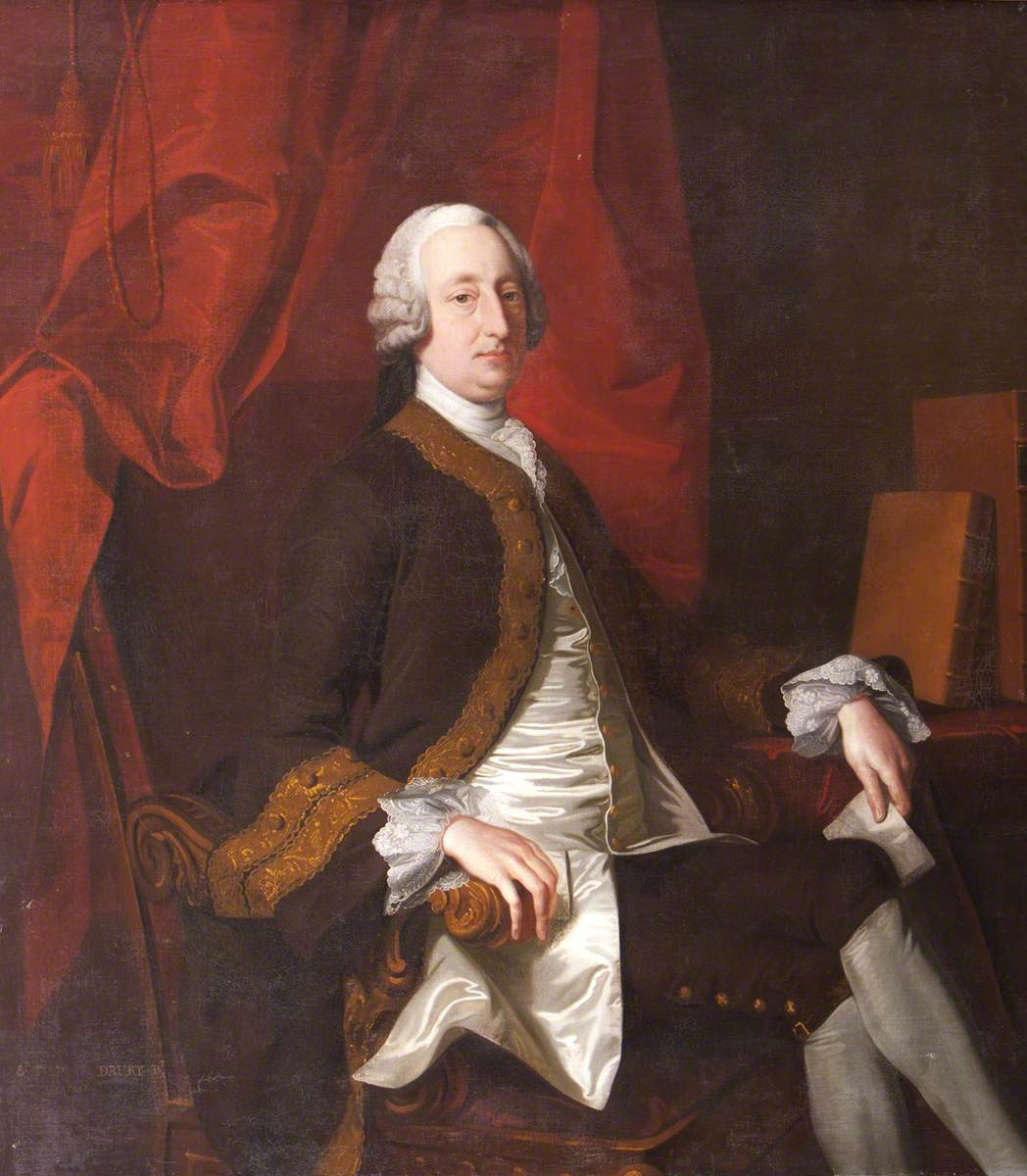
Sir Thomas Drury, 1754 portrait

Sir Thomas Drury, 1st Baronet FRS (1712 – 19 January 1759) of Wickham Hall near Maldon, Essex, and Overstone, Northamptonshire was an English politician who sat in the House of Commons between 1741 and 1747.

== Background ==
Drury was born in London and baptised on 12 November 1712 at St Andrew's Church, Holborn; he was the son of Richard Drury of Colne, Hunts. by Joyce, daughter of Thomas Beacon of Great Ilford, Essex. He matriculated at Merton College, Oxford in 1729, and was called to the bar at the Inner Temple, London, in 1736.

In 1737, as co-heir with his cousin Thomas Beacon Townsend (d.1737), Drury inherited a fortune estimated at £230,000, including an estate near Maldon, from his maternal uncle, Thomas Beacon, a brewer in Shoreditch, London. His cousin died later that year and left Drury his share of the estate. Fellow MP Joseph Townsend, who was the half-brother of Thomas Beacon Townsend, also benefited from the will.

== Career ==
Drury was elected Member of Parliament for Maldon in 1741. He was created 1st Baronet Drury, of Overstone, co. Northampton on 16 February 1739 and was invested as a Knight. He served as High Sheriff of Essex from 1740 to 1741 and High Sheriff of Northamptonshire from 1748 to 1749. He was elected Fellow of the Royal Society in 1758.

Escutcheon of the Drury baronets of Overstone

== Family ==
Drury married Martha, daughter of Sir John Tyrrell, 3rd Baronet, of Heron, Essex and Mary Dolliffe on 11 October 1737 at Somerset House Chapel, The Strand, London. They had a son who predeceased his father, and two daughters. Of the daughters:

- Mary Ann married in 1761 John Hobart, 2nd Earl of Buckinghamshire, as his first wife. She had broken off an engagement to Lord Halifax, about two years before.
- Jocosa Katherina married in 1770 Brownlow Cust, 1st Baron Brownlow, as his first wife.

Parliament of Great Britain
Preceded by Benjamin Keene; Martin Bladen	Member of Parliament for Maldon; 1741–1747; With: Robert Colebrooke	Succeeded by Sir Richard Lloyd; Robert Colebrooke
Baronetage of Great Britain
New creation	Baronet (of Overstone); 1739–1759	Extinct
Preceded by Hulse baronets	Drury baronets of Overstone; 16 February 1739	Succeeded by Thorold baronets
