= Hamon L'Estrange =

English writer on history and theology

Hamon L'Estrange (1605–1660) was an English writer on history, theology and liturgy, of Calvinist views, loyal both to Charles I and the Church of England. Along with Edward Stephens (d. 1706), he contributed to the seventeenth-century revival of interest in ancient liturgies; with John Cosin and Anthony Sparrow he began the genre of commentary on the Book of Common Prayer. He has been confused at times with his father, son and grandson of the same name.

== Life ==
L'Estrange was baptised at Sedgeford, Norfolk, 29 August 1605. He was the second son of Sir Hamon L'Estrange (1583–1654) of Hunstanton Hall, Norfolk and his wife Alice Stubbe, daughter of Richard Stubbe, of Sedgeford, Norfolk. He was admitted to Gray's Inn 12 August 1617, but does not appear to have been called to the bar. His life was mainly devoted to theological study. He maintained a Calvinistic sentiment at a time when Laud and several of his circle were wary of Calvinism.

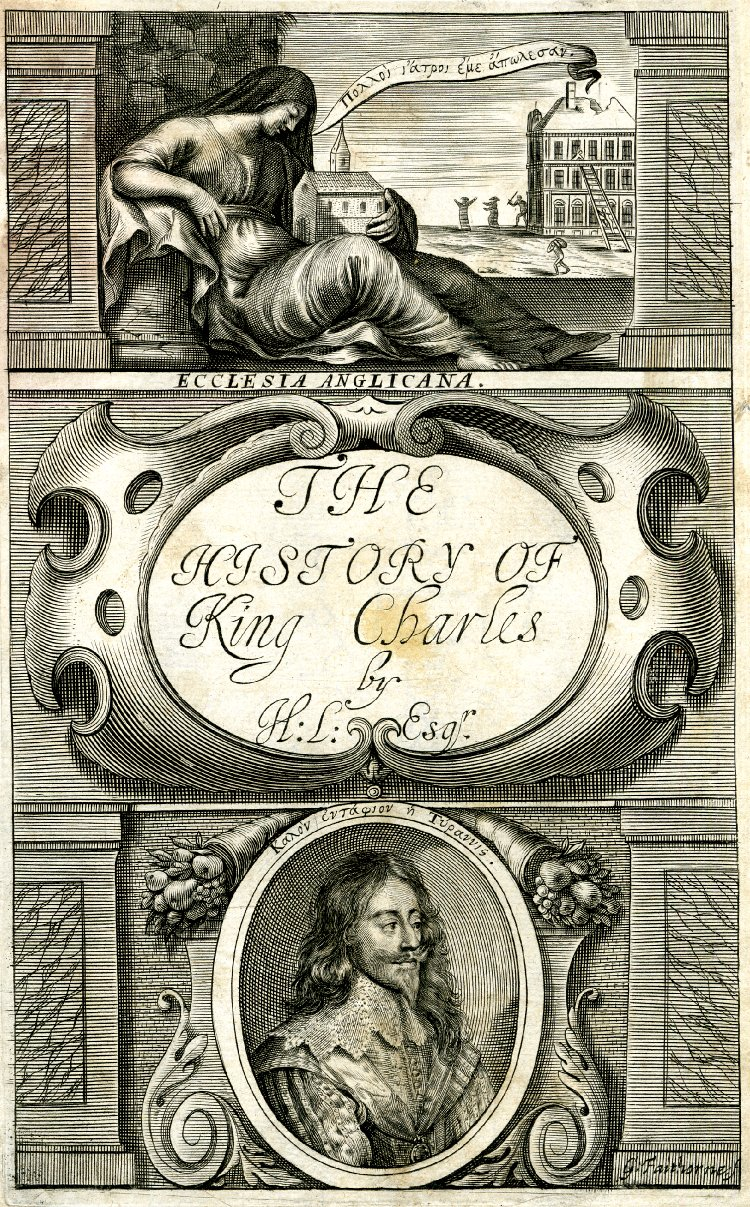
Title page by William Faithorne for L'Estrange's The History of King Charles.

On the outbreak of the First English Civil War he was a royalist, as were other family members. He was sent for as a delinquent for affronting the parliamentary committee of the county of Norfolk. With his father and brother he was embroiled in the attempted delivery of King's Lynn to the royal forces (August 1643); a little later he was ranked as colonel in the royal army. He speaks of having undergone an eight years' sequestration, apparently between 1643 and 1651. Writing to Edward Montagu, 2nd Earl of Manchester, 31 August 1644, he spoke of being reconciled to the sense of the parliament. From 1651 onwards he probably lived undisturbed and in comparative comfort at Ringstead, Norfolk and elsewhere. He died 7 August 1660, and was buried at Pakenham, Suffolk.

== Works ==
His works are:

- God's Sabbath before and under the Law and under thee Gospel, briefly vindicated from novell and heterodox assertions, Cambridge, 1641; an attempt to prove the Sabbath a divine and immutable institution, dedicated both to the parliament and to his father, Sir Hamon L'Estrange.
- An Answer to the Marquis of Worcester's last Paper to the late King, representing in true posture and discussing briefly the main Controversies between the English and Romish Church, together with some considerations upon Dr. Bayly's parenthetical interlocution relating to the church's power in deciding controversies of scripture (London, 1651), in which L'Estrange responds to a work of Thomas Bayly, and argues against the claim of the Catholic Church to be the sole judge of the meaning of scripture in controversies.
- Smectymnuo-mastix, or Short Animadversions upon Smectymnuus their Answer and Vindication of that Answer to the humble remonstrance in the cause of Liturgie, London, 1651 (appended to the previous work, but paged separately; a defence of the Liturgy of the Church of England against the Reply of Smectymnuus to the Remonstrance for the honour of the Liturgy.
- The Reign of King Charles, an History faithfully and impartially delivered and disposed into Annals, 1st edit. (anon.), London, 1655; 2nd edit, (by H. L., esq.), London, 1656, revised and somewhat enlarged, 'with a reply to some late observations upon that History.' This work, which Thomas Fuller praised, ends with the execution of Strafford. Peter Heylyn attacked it in Observations on the History of King Charles, 1656. In
- The Observator observed, or Animadversions upon the Observations on the History of King Charles, wherein that History is vindicated, partly illustrated, and several others things tending to the rectification of public mistakes are inserted, London, 1656. A reply to Heylyn, and Heylyn wrote in answer the Observator's Rejoinder and Extraneus Vapulans, 1656. In the latter he characterised L'Estrange as 'stiffly principled in the Puritan tenets, a semi-presbiterian at least in the form of church government, a nonconformist in the matter of ceremony, and a rigid sabbatarian in point of doctrine.' In his Alliance (p. xii of the Proemial Address) L'Estrange supplied the translation of Extraneus Vapulans as 'L'Estrange is beaten'.
- The Alliance of Divine Offices was his major work, in which L'Estrange replied to Heylyn on liturgical matters.

== Family ==
He was brother of Sir Nicholas L'Estrange, 1st Baronet and Roger L'Estrange. The father was author of a work often erroneously attributed to his son.

He married, first, Dorothy, daughter and coheiress of Edmund Laverick of Upwell, Norfolk; secondly, Judith, daughter of Bagnall of London and had issue five sons and five daughters. His eldest son, Hamon, who died 4 May 1717, married three times, and left a large family. His father's works have occasionally been assigned to him in error.
