= Nicholas L'Estrange =

Nicholas L'Estrange may refer to:

- Sir Nicholas L'Estrange (politician, born 1511) (1511–1580), English politician
- Sir Nicholas L'Estrange, 1st Baronet (1604–1655), English collector of anecdotes
- Sir Nicholas L'Estrange, 4th Baronet (1661–1724), English Tory politician
