= Charles Cornwallis (diplomat) =

English courtier and diplomat

Sir Charles Cornwallis JP
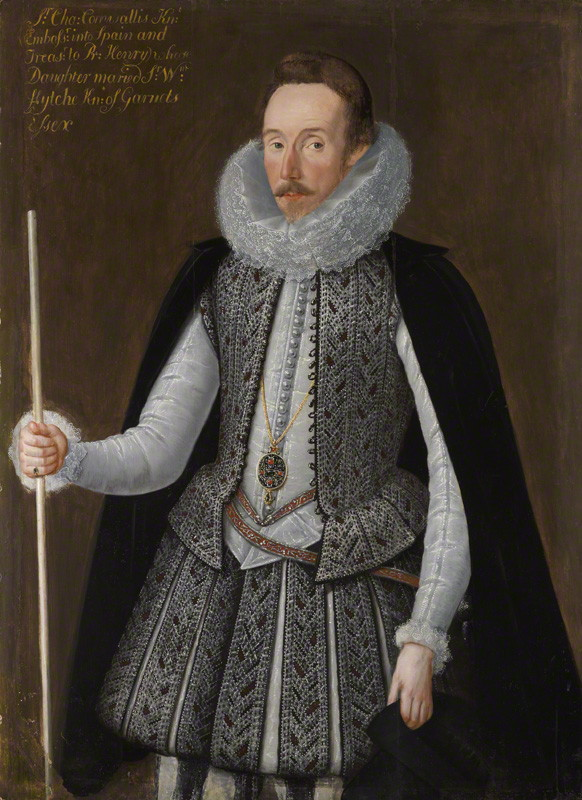

Ambassador of England to Spain
- In office 1605–1609
- Monarch: James I
- Preceded by: Charles Howard (1577)
- Succeeded by: Francis Cottington

Member of Parliament for Norfolk
- In office March 1604 – 9 February 1611 Serving with Nathaniel Bacon of Stiffkey
- Preceded by: Bassingbourne Gawdy II
- Succeeded by: Hamon le Strange

Personal details
- Born: c. 1555 Brome, Suffolk, England
- Died: 21 December 1629 (aged 73–74) Harborne, Staffordshire, England
- Spouses: Elizabeth Farnham (m. 1578; died 1584); Anne Barrow Skelton (m. 1585; died 1617); Dorothy Vaughan Jegon (m. 1620)
- Children: 9, including William
- Parents: Sir Thomas Cornwallis; Anne Jerningham Cornwallis
- Relatives: Elizabeth Kitson (sister); William Cornwallis (brother)
- Education: Trinity College, Cambridge

Sir Charles Cornwallis (c. 1555 – 21 December 1629) was an English courtier and diplomat.

== Life ==
He was the second son of Sir Thomas Cornwallis, controller of Queen Mary's household, who had been imprisoned by Elizabeth in 1570. He was probably born at his father's house of Brome Hall, Suffolk.

Nothing is known of Cornwallis till 11 July 1603, when he was knighted. In 1604 he was Member of Parliament for Norfolk. Early in 1605 he was sent as resident ambassador to Spain. He was active in attempting to protect English merchants from the Spanish Inquisition, and lobbied the home government for English commercial interests. He was recalled in September 1609, and his secretary, Francis Cottington, took his place at Madrid.

In 1610 he became treasurer of the household of Henry, Prince of Wales, resisted the proposal to marry the prince to a daughter of the Duke of Savoy, and attended his master through his fatal illness of 1612. He was a candidate for the post of master of the wards in the same year; was one of four commissioners sent to Ireland on 11 September 1613 to investigate Irish grievances, and reported that Ireland had no very substantial ground for complaint.

In 1614 Cornwallis was suspected of fanning the parliamentary opposition to the king. John Hoskins, who had made himself conspicuous in the House of Commons of England by his denunciation of Scots and Scottish institutions, declared when arrested that he was Cornwallis's agent. Cornwallis disclaimed all knowledge of Hoskins, but admitted that he had procured the election of another member of parliament, and had supplied him with notes for a speech against recusants and Scotchmen. The privy council placed Cornwallis under arrest in June 1614, and he was imprisoned in the Tower of London for a year, with Hoskins and Leonel Sharp.

Cornwallis, who at one time lived at Beeston St Andrew, Norfolk, as well as in Suffolk, retired late in life to Harborne, Staffordshire, where he died on 21 December 1629. He was buried in London at St. Giles in the Fields.

== Works ==
Cornwallis wrote:

- A Discourse of the most illustrious Prince Henry, late Prince of Wales, written an. 1626, London, 1641 and 1644, 1738 and 1751; republished in Somers Tracts (ii.), and in the Harleian Miscellany (iv.)

In John Gutch's Collectanea Curiosa are two papers by Cornwallis detailing the negotiations for Prince Henry's marriage with the Spanish Infanta and the Savoyard princess. Ralph Winwood's Memorials (ii. and iii.) and Edmund Sawyer, Memorials of Affairs of State (1725) include many of Cornwallis's official letters from Spain.

== Family ==
Cornwallis married three times:

1. Elizabeth (married 1578; died 1584), daughter of Thomas Farnham of Fincham, Norfolk.
2. Anne, (married 1585; died 1617), daughter of Thomas Barrow, widow of Ralph Skelton (d. 30 March 1617).
3. Dorothy (married 29 April 1620), daughter of Richard Vaughan, bishop of London, and widow of John Jegon, bishop of Norwich.

Sir William Cornwallis was Sir Charles's son by his first wife.
