= Hamon le Strange =

English politician and landowner (1583–1654)

Sir Hamon le Strange (c. 1583 – 31 May 1654) was an English politician who sat in the House of Commons at various times between 1614 and 1626. He supported the Royalist cause in the English Civil War. His family were Norfolk gentry long based at their manor of Hunstanton.

== Life and career ==
Le Strange was the son of Sir Nicholas le Strange of Hunstanton and his wife Mary Bell, and a great-grandson of the MP Sir Nicholas L'Estrange. He was admitted to Queens' College, Cambridge on 26 July 1601 and knighted on 13 March 1604. From 1608 to 1609 he was the High Sheriff of Norfolk.

In 1614 and again in 1625 Le Strange was elected MP for Norfolk. In 1625 and 1626 he was also elected MP for Castle Rising.

In 1616 a priest, Thomas Tunstal, escaped from Wisbech Castle to Norfolk. L'Estrange had him pursued and apprehended. He was tried at Norwich and condemned and executed.

During the English Civil War, Le Strange served as the Royalist Governor of King's Lynn in 1643. The honour was short-lived, as the town was besieged by Parliamentarians. When it surrendered, Hamon's family had to pay over £1000 in compensation. Other bills accrued and enemies arranged for its lands to be forfeited in 1649–1651.

== Family ==
Le Strange married Alice Stubbe in 1602, daughter of the family's lawyer, Richard Stubbe, of Sedgeford, Norfolk. They are known to have had four children.

- Hamon was a writer on history, theology and liturgy.
- Roger, was a religious pamphleteer.
- Nicholas became a baronet.
- Elizabeth married the Parliamentarian politician Sir William Spring.

Le Strange died in 1654 aged 71.

Parliament of England
Preceded by Sir Nathaniel Bacon; Sir Charles Cornwallis	Member of Parliament for Norfolk; 1614–1622; With: Sir Henry Bedingfield 1614; Drue Drury 1621–1622	Succeeded by Sir Thomas Holland; Sir John Corbet, 1st Baronet
Preceded by Sir Robert Spiller; Sir Thomas Bancroft	Member of Parliament for Castle Rising; 1625–1626; With: Sir Thomas Bancroft	Succeeded by Sir Thomas Bancroft; Sir Robert Cotton
