= Drury baronets =

Extinct baronetcy in the Baronetage of England

There have been two baronetcies created for persons with the surname Drury, one in the Baronetage of England and one in the Baronetage of Great Britain. Both creations are extinct.

The Drury Baronetcy, of Riddlesworth in the County of Norfolk, was created in the Baronetage of England on 7 May 1627 for Drue Drury, Member of Parliament for Norfolk and Thetford. The title became extinct on the death of the third Baronet in 1712.

The Drury Baronetcy, of Overstone in the County of Northampton, was created in the Baronetage of Great Britain on 16 February 1739 for Thomas Drury, Member of Parliament for Maldon. The title became extinct on his death in 1759.

Escutcheon of the Drury baronets of Riddlesworth, and of Overstone

== Drury baronets, of Riddlesworth (1627) ==
- Sir Drue Drury, 1st Baronet (1588–1632)
- Sir Drue Drury, 2nd Baronet (1611–1647)
- Sir Robert Drury, 3rd Baronet (c. 1633–1712)

== Drury baronets, of Overstone (1739) ==
- Sir Thomas Drury, 1st Baronet (1712–1759)
