= Hunstanton Hall =

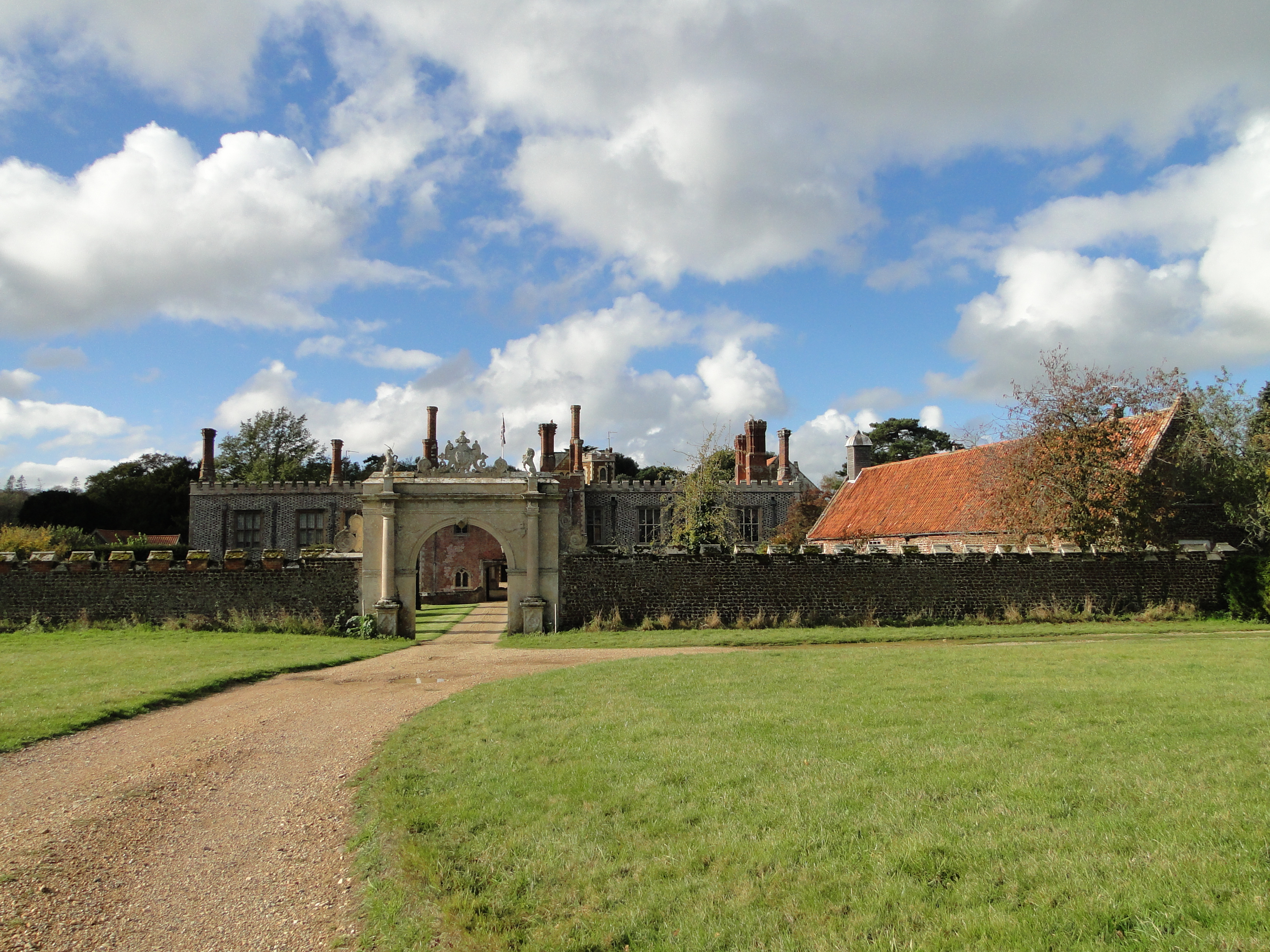

- Location within Norfolk
- 52.947°N 0.5167°E
- Type: House
- Location: Old Hunstanton, Norfolk

Site notes
- Governing body: Privately owned

Listed Building – Grade I
- Official name: Hunstanton Hall, Moat Bridge and Garden and Forecourt Walls
- Designated: 5 June 1953
- Reference no.: 1171725

Listed Building – Grade I
- Official name: Detached Porch in Courtyard of Hunstanton Hall
- Designated: 5 June 1953
- Reference no.: 1077922

Listed Building – Grade I
- Official name: Entrance Gate Curtain Walls and Barn to East of Hunstanton Hall
- Designated: 20 September 1984
- Reference no.: 1171822

Hunstanton Hall is a country house in Old Hunstanton, Norfolk, England, dating originally from the 15th century. The gatehouse, now detached from the main building, is dated 1487. The wings were built in the seventeenth century and there are Victorian additions. The house was the ancestral home of the L'Estrange family, resident from the time of Domesday until after World War II. During the early 20th century, P. G. Wodehouse, a friend of Charles Le Strange, was a frequent visitor and the hall features in his novel Money for Nothing (1928) and his collection of short stories Very Good, Jeeves (1930). The hall has also been suggested as a model for Blandings Castle. The building suffered two major fires, in 1853 and 1947. In 1948, the hall was sold and converted into apartments. Hunstanton Hall is a Grade I listed building.

== History ==
According to William Dugdale's Baronage of England Guy L'Estrange arrived with William the Conqueror as an officer in the service of Flaald and was granted lands in Norfolk. The accuracy of Dugdale's account of the family's early history has been questioned as it appears to derive from an English version of the French romance of Fulk FitzWarin. By the 15th century the family were established as significant local magnates, Hamon le Strange (1583–1654) undertaking the construction of the Jacobean wings of the hall between 1625 and 1640. He served as MP for Norfolk and was a committed Royalist. His wife, Alice was a notable early estate manager; her accounts and records of life, income and expenditure at Hunstanton were published by the Norfolk Record Society in 2015. Their son, Roger was an equally enthusiastic supporter of, and propagandist for, Charles II. Henry L'Estrange Styleman Le Strange (1815–1862) founded the town of Hunstanton as a Victorian seaside resort. (Note: Henry L’Estrange Styleman Le Strange is commemorated by a statue in bronze on The Green at Hunstanton. The statue stands in front of the Golden Lion Hotel, Le Stange’s first effort at the fledgling resort, and designed by his friend William Butterfield.)

In the early 20th century, P. G. Wodehouse, a friend of Charles Le Strange, was a regular guest at the hall. A number of his works used the hall as the basis for fictional houses, in particular, Rudge Hall in the 1928 novel, Money for Nothing. (Note: Hunstanton is the model for Aunt Agatha's country seat Woollam Chersey.) Some critics have also suggested Hunstanton as the basis for Blandings Castle, although other country houses have stronger claims. The hall was certainly the basis model for Anchorstone Hall in L. P. Hartley's first novel, The Shrimp and the Anemone, published in 1944. Some believe that Wodehouse based the award-winning pig Empress of Blandings on a pig that was resident at the pigsty attached to the hall at the time of his visits.

The hall is now subdivided as apartments. Public access is limited.

== Architecture and description ==
Hunstanton Hall is a moated house, mainly of two storeys. The principal construction materials are clunch and carrstone. Its building history is complex, with elements dating from the 15th, 17th and 19th centuries. Two major fires, in the mid-19th and mid-20th centuries, led to structural losses and reconstruction. The first hall dates from the late 15th century. Its only remaining element is the gatehouse, dating to the 1480s. The entrance archway is of 1623–1624, of the same building period as the Jacobean ranges of 1625–1640. There are later Victorian additions, mainly as a result of the 1853 fire. Nikolaus Pevsner and Bill Wilson, in their Norfolk 2: North-West and South volume of the Buildings of England series, note the involvement of Thomas Thorpe and William Edge in the Jacobean rebuilding. The later Victorian work, much in a High Victorian Gothic style, has been tentatively attributed to Frederick Preedy.

=== Listing designations ===
Historic England is the statutory body with responsibility for the listing of buildings in England. It uses a three-tier rating system, classifying listed buildings into three categories; Grade I, the highest grade, for buildings of “exceptional interest”, Grade II*, the next grade, for buildings of “more than special interest”, and Grade II, the lowest grade, for buildings of “special interest”.

The hall, including the gatehouse, is a Grade I listed building. The 17th century porch and the entrance archway are also listed Grade I. The Stable Court, Stable Cottage, Game Larder, and barn, are all listed Grade II, as are the pairs of Gate piers. The Octagon, a garden summerhouse which features in one of Wodehouse's works, is listed Grade II*. (Note: Sir Hamon Le Strange reputedly constructed the Octagon, a pavilion on an island, surrounded by a small moat, as a place where he could practice his violin undisturbed.) The gardens and parkland surrounding the hall are listed Grade II on the Register of Historic Parks and Gardens of Special Historic Interest in England.

== Sources ==
- Le Strange, Hamon (1916). Le Strange Records: A Chronicle of the Early Le Stranges of Norfolk and the March of Wales - 1100-1300. London: Longmans. OCLC 1048323985.
- Pevsner, Nikolaus; Wilson, Bill (2002). Norfolk 2: North-west and South. The Buildings Of England. New Haven, US and London: Yale University Press. ISBN 978-0-300-09657-6. OCLC 1101266459.
