= Sir Drue Drury, 1st Baronet =

English landowner and politician

Sir Drue Drury, 1st Baronet (7 October 1588 – 23 April 1632) was an English landowner and politician who sat in the House of Commons between 1621 and 1624.

Drury was the son of Sir Drue Drury of Hedgerley, Buckinghamshire and of Linstead, Kent and his second wife Catharine Finch, daughter of William Finch, of Linstead. His father was a Gentleman Usher to Queen Elizabeth. He was admitted at Peterhouse, Cambridge in 1607. In 1617 he succeeded to the estates of his father. He also possessed an estate at Riddlesworth, Norfolk. In 1621, he was elected Member of Parliament for Norfolk. He was elected MP for Thetford in 1624. He was created a baronet on 7 May 1627.

Drury died at the age of 43 and was buried at Riddlesworth where there was a monument.

Drury married Anne Waldegrave, daughter of Edward Waldegrave, of Lawford, Essex, and his first wife a daughter of Bartholomew Averell, of Essex on 28 June 1608. He was succeeded in the baronetcy by his son Drue. His widow remarried to Mr Gleane, of Hardwick, Norfolk and died before May 1642 when her will was proved.

Parliament of England
Preceded by Sir Henry Bedingfield; Sir Hamon le Strange	Member of Parliament for Norfolk; 1621–1622; With: Sir Hamon le Strange	Succeeded by Sir Thomas Holland; Sir John Corbet, 1st Baronet
Preceded by Sir Thomas Holland; Framlingham Gawdy	Member of Parliament for Thetford; 1624; With: Framlingham Gawdy	Succeeded by Framlingham Gawdy; Sir Robert Cotton, 1st Baronet
Baronetage of England
New creation	Baronet (of Riddlesworth); 1627–1632	Succeeded by Drue Drury
