= Edmund Sawyer (historian) =

English barrister

Edmund Sawyer (died 1759) was an English barrister. He became a master of chancery, and is known also as an officer of arms and historical compiler.

== Life ==
Born shortly after 1687, he was probably a younger son of Edmund Sawyer of White Waltham, Berkshire, by his wife Mary, second daughter of John Finch of Fiennes, Berkshire. He was of the Inner Temple, but on 28 April 1718 he was admitted as a member of Lincoln's Inn.

Undertaking legal business for John Montagu, 2nd Duke of Montagu, Sawyer became through the Duke's connection gentleman-usher to the Order of the Bath in 1725, and Brunswick herald in 1726. The latter involved him in the 1727 coronation of George II of Great Britain. In 1738 he was made a master in chancery, and around this time he vacated the posts with the Order of the Bath. In 1750, Sawyer and Richard Edwards were nominated as commissioners to examine the claims of the creditors of the African Company of Merchants.

Sawyer died a master in chancery, on 9 October 1759.

== Works ==
Sawyer compiled Memorials of Affairs of State in the Reigns of Queen Elizabeth and King James London, 3 vols. 1725. It used the papers of Sir Ralph Winwood and Sir Henry Neville.
