= Roger L'Estrange =

English pamphleteer (1616–1704)

Sir Roger L'Estrange
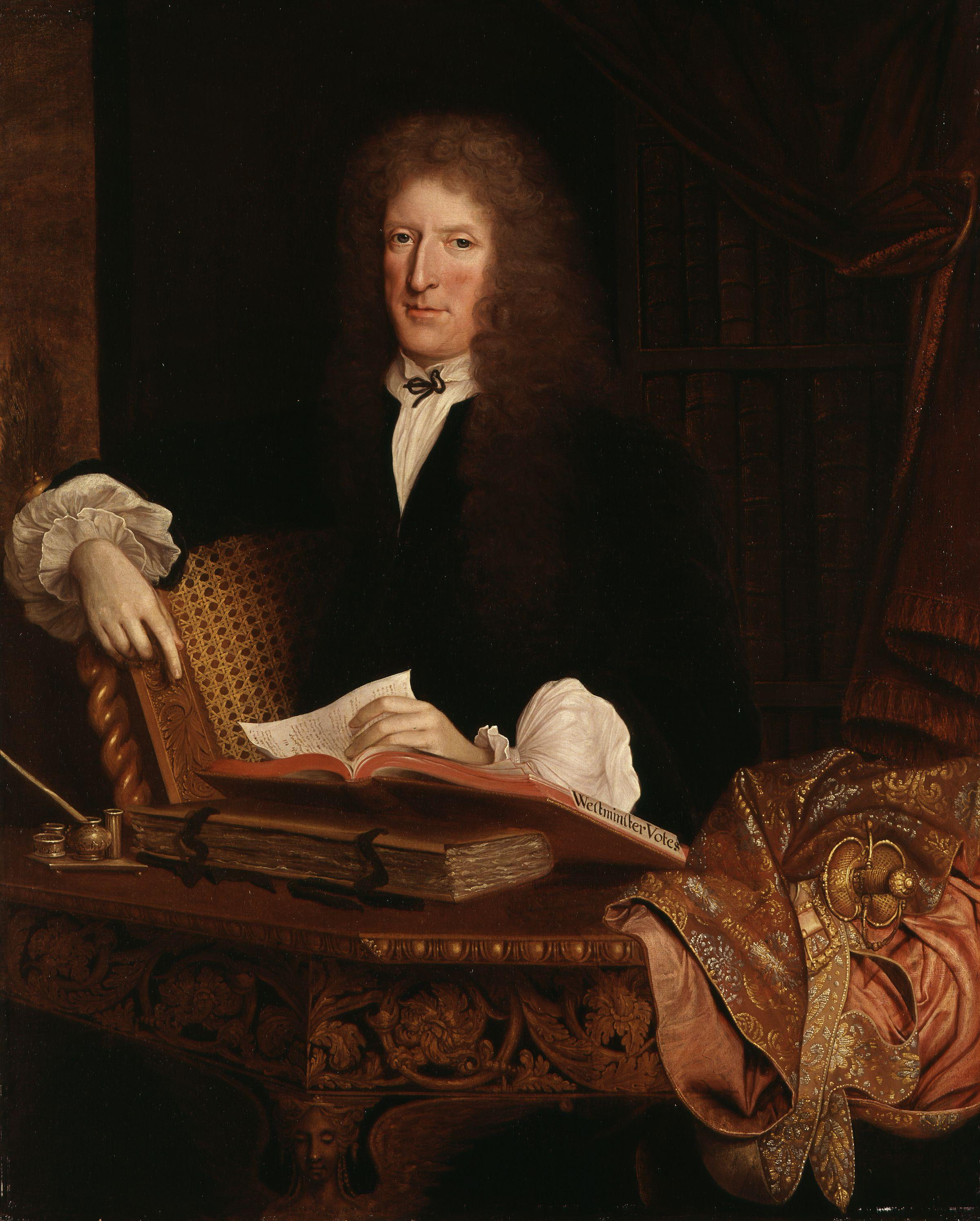
- Portrait by John Michael Wright, c. 1680

Member of Parliament for Winchester
- In office 1685–1687

Personal details
- Born: 17 December 1616 Old Hunstanton, Norfolk, England
- Died: 11 December 1704 (aged 87) London, England
- Party: Tory
- Spouse: Anne Dolman (died 1694)
- Parents: Hamon le Strange; Alice Stubbe
- Relatives: Hamon L'Estrange (brother)
- Education: Sidney Sussex College, Cambridge
- Occupation: Author; pamphleteer; translator; newspaper publisher

Military service
- Allegiance: English Royalist

Sir Roger L'Estrange (17 December 1616 – 11 December 1704) was an English pamphleteer, author, courtier and press censor. Throughout his life L'Estrange was frequently mired in controversy and acted as a staunch ideological defender of King Charles II's regime during the Restoration era. His works played a key role in the emergence of a distinct 'Tory' bloc during the Exclusion Crisis of 1679–81. Perhaps his best known polemical pamphlet was An Account of the Growth of Knavery, which ruthlessly attacked the parliamentary opposition to Charles II and his successor James, Duke of York (later King James II), placing them as fanatics who misused contemporary popular anti-Catholic sentiment to attack the Restoration court and the existing social order in order to pursue their own political ends. Following the Exclusion Crisis and the failure of the nascent Whig faction to disinherit James, Duke of York in favour of Charles II's illegitimate son James, 1st Duke of Monmouth, L'Estrange used his newspaper The Observator to harangue his opponents and act as a voice for a popular provincial Toryism during the 'Tory Reaction' of 1681–85. Despite serving as an MP from 1685 to 1687 his stock fell under James II's reign as his staunch hostility to religious nonconformism conflicted with James's goals of religious tolerance for both Catholics and Nonconformists. The Glorious Revolution of 1688 and the collapse of the Restoration political order heralded the end of L'Estrange's career in public life, although his greatest translation work, that of Aesop's Fables, saw publication in 1692.

== Early life ==
Roger L'Estrange was born at Hunstanton Hall, Hunstanton, Norfolk, the youngest son of Alice L'Estrange and Sir Hamon L'Estrange. His mother ran the estate and his father served as Sheriff and Deputy Lieutenant of Norfolk, and was allied to the dukes of Norfolk, serving as a Member of Parliament in a seat under their control. He was probably home-schooled for a time before attending Eton College and then Sidney Sussex College, Cambridge, with his time spent being home-schooled acting as a major formative influence which generated his interest in Humanistic literature and his lifelong passion for playing the viol.

In 1639, both father and son fought in the Bishops' Wars against the Scots. They later fought for the Royalist side in the First English Civil War. In 1643, the two led a failed conspiracy whose purpose was place the town of King's Lynn under Royalist control. Roger L'Estrange's subsequent activities as a Royalist conspirator lead to him spending time in prison under sentence of death. He later played a leading role in the 1648 Royalist uprising in Kent. This was defeated by parliamentarian troops and he fled to the Continent, finding refuge in Holland.

Following the Act of General Pardon and Oblivion 1652 L'Estrange returned to England where he was strictly examined by the Council of State on the 7 Sept. 1653. On 31 Oct, following a personal interview with Cromwell he was released from further attendance upon the court. L'Estrange's precise conduct during this interview and his subsequent relationship with the Lord Protector would become a source of acrimonious controversy after the Restoration. His detractors claimed that he had discredited his old principles by associating on friendly terms with Cromwell. This included, by his own admission, once having performed in concert for him at the house of the organist John Hingston. This earned for him the unfriendly nickname of 'Oliver's Fiddler' or 'Old Nol's Fidler', which was to follow him for the rest of his life.

L'Estrange lived quietly in Norfolk until Cromwell died in 1658. By 1659, however he was already making his presence as a Royalist known. He printed several pamphlets supporting a return of Charles II and attacked various Commonwealth writers, including John Milton in a 1660 pamphlet titled No Blinde Guides for his role in philosophically justifying the regicide of King Charles I.

== Restoration years – 1660–79 ==
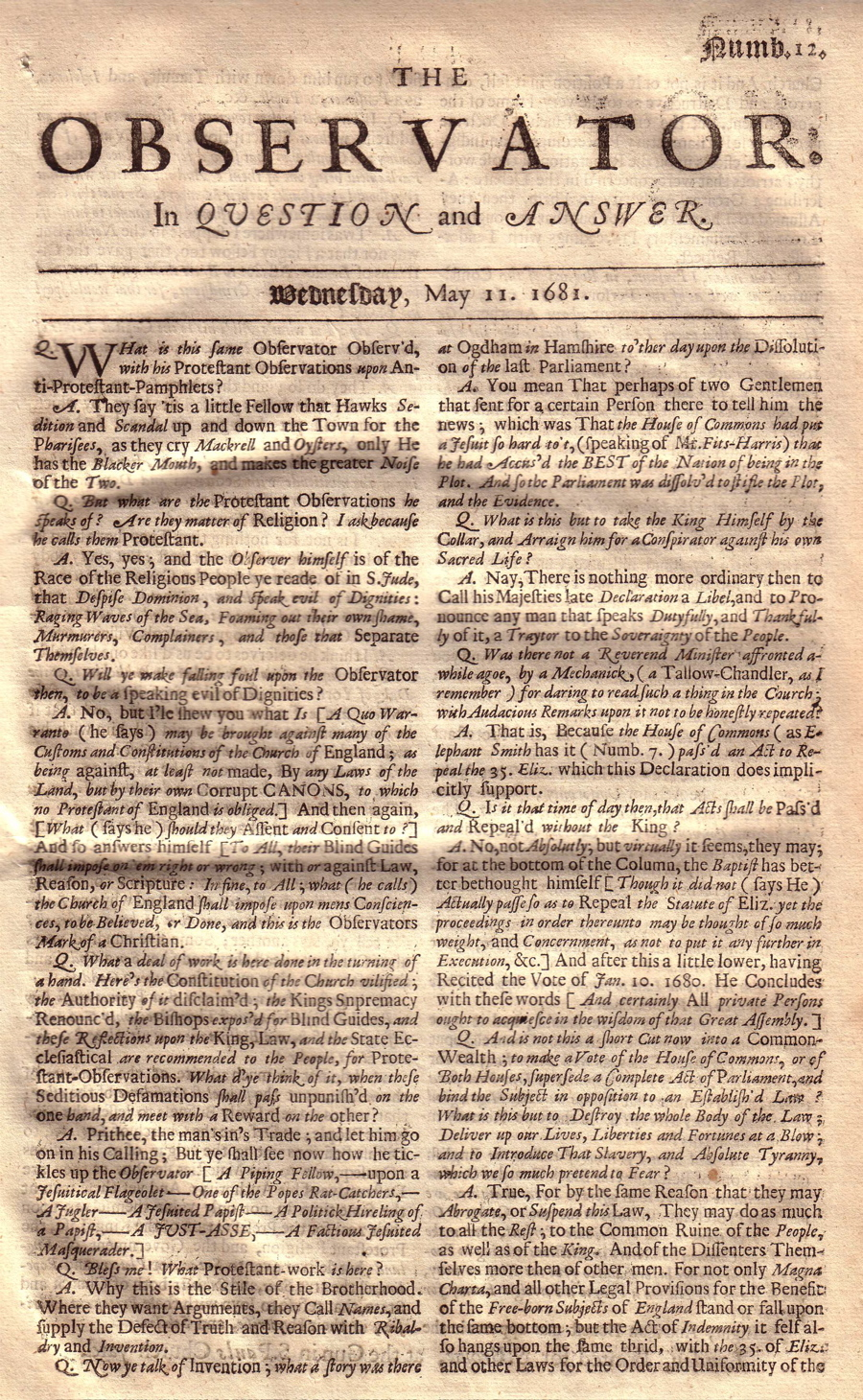
L'Estrange's The Observator of 11 May 1681

L'Estrange spent the first two years of the Restoration settling old scores against figures associated with the previous regime and bolstering his credentials as a Royalist writer and courtier. A typical pamphlet of this phase in his career was A Rope for Pol, a lengthy diatribe attacking Marchamont Nedham, who had edited the official newsbook from 1655 under Cromwell's Protectorate.

He also waged a struggle for official titles and courtly influence with the journalist Sir John Berkenhead during this period. They acted as proxies for a wider courtly struggle between Henry Bennet, 1st Earl of Arlington and Edward Nicholas who contended for influence in the regime under Edward Hyde, 3rd Earl of Clarendon, with L'Estrange coming under Bennet's patronage. The failure of Berkenhead to stem the tide of Nonconformist printing after the Great Ejection of 1662 which purged the Church of England of its Presbyterian ministers led to Berkenhead's downfall to L'Estrange's benefit. Likewise, Nicholas was subject to an involuntary early retirement at the expense of Bennet who became a favoured statesman of Charles II.

As a reward for his propaganda and his alignment with Bennet's rising star, L'Estrange was granted a warrant to seize seditious books or pamphlets in 1662 and in recognition of his Considerations and Proposals in Order to the Regulation of the Press he was appointed Surveyor of the Press the following year. Thereafter, also appointed Licenser of the Press, he retained both positions until the lapse of the Licensing of the Press Act in 1679.

As Licenser and Surveyor, L'Estrange was charged with the prevention of the publication of dissenting writings, and authorised to search the premises of printers and booksellers on the merest suspicion of dissension. L'Estrange excelled at this, hunting down hidden presses and enlisting peace officers and soldiers to suppress their activities. He soon came to be known as the "Bloodhound of the Press." His careful monitoring and control of nonconformist ideas and opinions succeeded not only in checking seditious publications, but also in limiting political controversy and reducing debate.

There were, however, notable excesses. Under L'Estrange, the antennae of state censorship prickled at the very mention of the monarch and he famously objected to the following lines from Milton's Paradise Lost:

As when the Sun new ris'n
Looks through the Horizontal misty Air
Shorn of his Beams, or from behind the Moon
In dim Eclips disastrous twilight sheds
On half the Nations, and with fear of change
Perplexes Monarchs.

In 1668, William Lilly, the astrologer and occultist, had commented on the connection between comets and the death of princes in a draft to his 1670 almanac: comets indicated, wrote Lilly, "some dreadful matter at hand," and were "a prediction of the fall of kings and tyrants." The latter comment was removed from the draft by L'Estrange.

In addition to these duties as press censor, L'Estrange began his journalistic career in earnest in 1663, when he was granted control over the official periodicals The Public Intelligencer and The News. L'Estrange lacked Berkenhead's independence and owed his position to Bennet's patronage. Within the periodicals he acted in favour of the Court's increasingly intolerant policy towards Nonconformity, with frequent and lengthy attacks on Nonconformist writers coupled with demands for information with regards to 'libellous' printing. His diatribes gave free publicity to Nonconformist printers, but he also achieved some success in suppressing the prints after around 1664, particularly after the Nonconformist publishers Thomas Brewster and Nathan Dover died in prison.

The Second Anglo-Dutch War led to a huge increase in demand for accurate and detailed news reporting from the literate public, which L'Estrange failed to satisfy. His publications were dominated by anti-Nonconformist rants and advertising, with readers believing his use of a large typeface covered up a lack of substance. This left him vulnerable to an intrigue by Joseph Williamson and Henry Muddiman, who wrested him from this lucrative post. Muddiman had worked under L'Estrange and used his free use of the postal service to send copies of his unofficial newsletters alongside the two official titles. The diarist Samuel Pepys noted approvingly that Muddiman's new titles included 'no folly' in contrast to L'Estrange's works.

From late 1665 to 1679 L'Estrange's polemical and literary output was limited. The 'satire boom' of the late 1660s took up much of his time in censorious duties, while he remained a prominent figure at Court. In particular he spent much time acting as a conduit between the Worshipful Company of Stationers, who had extensive censorship duties, and the House of Lords in formulating press regulation policy and repressing 'libellous' prints.

At this period, too, he helped Thomas Britton found his concert series, playing the viol at the first event in 1678. The viol remained a lifelong love and throughout his career L'Estrange was known as 'Noll's Fiddler' after accusations he had played music for Oliver Cromwell before 1658, with the implication he was an unprincipled 'hack'.

== Crisis and reaction – 1679–85 ==
The Licensing of the Press Act lapsed at a dangerous time for the Restoration regime, which now contended with the twin crises of the Exclusion Crisis and the hysteria generated by the fabricated Popish Plot. With no official post to censor 'libels' or attack critics of the Court, L'Estrange returned to polemic. Writers such as Andrew Marvell attacked what they saw as growing Catholic and tyrannical tendencies at Court. Marvell coined the phrase 'Popery and Arbitrary Government' in a 1677 polemic which argued that excessive Catholic influence at court would lead to a 'Catholic' system of government based on superstition and tyrannical repression. This played on contemporary Anglo-Scottish worldviews which relied on a construction of Catholicism as essentially foreign, tyrannical, and irrational or superstitious. The failure of Charles II's foreign policy in the Third Anglo-Dutch War and the ensuing rapprochement with the Netherlands aligned English politics against France, while figures like Marvell feared Charles II saw Louis XIV of France as a role model for absolutist rule. Marvell and like-minded figures coalesced into the Whig faction during the Exclusion Crisis and advocated the removal of James, Duke of York, an open Catholic, from the royal succession in favour of the Protestant illegitimate son of Charles II, James Scott, 1st Duke of Monmouth.

L'Estrange inverted the language of Whiggish opposition to the Court. In An Account of the Growth of Knavery he accused Marvell and other figures of playing to popular fears in order to sow social disorder and advance their own causes. His most striking work was Popery in Masquerade which directly adopted the language of Whig anti-Catholicism by depicting Nonconformists as agents of the Pope who sought to attack the existing social order and introduce their own tyrannical regime, invoking memories of the Rule of the Major-Generals. In Citt and Bumpkin he directly appealed to provincial English patriotism, accusing London-based Whigs of using sophistry to attack the Crown to which loyal Englishmen owed their allegiance. It was during this, the period of the Exclusion Crisis that L'Estrange is first credited with being the man who introduced and firmly established the terms Whig and Tory in the English political dictionary.

The Popish Plot presented greater dangers to L'Estrange. From 1680 his attacks on Titus Oates's confederates took up an increasing amount of his time. A rare concession to public feeling saw L'Estrange not attack Oates openly during the time of greatest hysteria in 1680–81, but attacks on related figures such as Miles Prance and Israel Tonge became a heavy part of his work. Prance's accusation that L'Estrange was a Catholic led to a genuine fear for his safety and contributed towards his brief exile in Edinburgh and The Hague during 1680. An anonymous woodcut of the time mocked L'Estrange as 'Towzer', the Court's attack dog fleeing to his master the Pope.

This episode damaged his reputation at Court, as did his increasingly vitriolic 'bantering' towards Oates's allies which ultimately inflamed the public mood. L'Estrange had damaged his case with works such as Citt and Bumpkin which employed the language of anti-Court rhetoric for his own ends, and ultimately a 1680 Council of State hearing focused more on his reputation than on the substance of the Popish Plot. Oates's increasingly deranged accusations discredited his plots by the end of 1681 while attempts to replace the Duke of York as heir with the Duke of Monmouth likewise failed. This period represented a major victory for the pro-Court faction, becoming known as 'Tories', but L'Estrange found himself increasingly out of favour.

In 1681 L'Estrange founded The Observator, a single sheet printed in double columns on both sides. It was written in the form of a dialogue between a Whig and a Tory (later Trimmer and Observator), with the bias on the side of the latter. During the six years of its existence, L'Estrange wrote with a consistent fierceness, meeting his enemies with personal attacks characterised by sharp wit. One of his main targets was Titus Oates, whose false allegations eventually brought about his conviction for perjury in 1685. The Observator was no longer a mouthpiece for the Court, but represented a provincial Toryism appealing to staunch former Cavaliers like L'Estrange who felt embittered by the Court's pandering to Oates, equivocation towards Whigs, and failure to reward their loyalty. After years dedicated to suppressing the press, L'Estrange began writing a periodical aimed at a mass audience. He maintained an educational and paternalistic stance, arguing the paper was necessary to 'set the masses right' after seditious printings had turned them against their natural superiors.

The dialogue format lent itself to being read aloud in public spaces, while the aggressive diatribes amused an audience who above all revelled in the drama and vitriol of Restoration politics. The execution in 1681 of the hardline Whig pamphleteer Stephen College filled L'Estrange with ill-concealed glee and emboldened him to settle old scores as Titus Oates was increasingly the prime subject of his attacks. Throughout this period L'Estrange argued that there was no Popish Plot, with the only conspiracy being a Nonconformist one of the sort depicted in Popery in Masquerade.

The discovery of the Rye House Plot in 1683 filled L'Estrange with a powerful sense of vindication as several leading Whigs were implicated in an assassination plot against Charles II. His obsession with detecting subliminal messages in print between plotters and earlier assertions of a 'Presbyterian Plot' directed by shadowy cliques finally seemed proven correct. With the Whig faction broken by the Plot's discovery and execution of several prominent Whigs such as William Russell, L'Estrange replaced the Observator's Whig interlocuter with the Trimmer, a moderate figure such as George Savile, 1st Marquess of Halifax who 'trimmed' between the Tory and Whig factions. This represented the culmination of a career-long tendency to attack moderates who craved respectability but were not wholly loyal to the Court and Tory cause. L'Estrange had long feared 'moderate' Presbyterians who enabled extremists and this represented a natural culmination of them.

== Later career ==
In 1685, L'Estrange was knighted by James II and became a member of parliament for Winchester from 1685 to 1687. However, though a fierce Tory and High Anglican, he opposed the religious toleration of Catholics, which put him at odds with the policy of the new king. After the Glorious Revolution in favour of William III, he lost all his offices and was arrested several times on suspicion of involvement in plots against him.

L'Estrange now turned to writing again, and published translations of Seneca the Younger's Morals and Cicero's Offices, besides his master-work of this period, Fables of Aesop and Other Eminent Mythologists (1692). This notably included nearly all of the Hecatomythium of Laurentius Abstemius, among several other fabulists. The style is idiomatic and each fable is accompanied by a short moral and a longer reflection, which set the format for fable collections for the next century.

In 1702, he completed his acclaimed English translation of The works of Flavius Josephus. Additionally he wrote a 'Key' to Hudibras, a 17th-century satire by Samuel Butler on the English Civil War, which was included in several 18th-century editions of the work.

L'Estrange died on 11 December 1704, within five days of his eighty-eighth birthday. He lies buried and memorialised in the church of St. Giles-in-the-Fields in London.

== Family life ==
L'Estrange married Anne, daughter of Sir Thomas Dolman of Shaw, Berkshire. After her death in April 1694, he wrote to his grand-nephew: "Play and gaming company have been the ruin of her wretched self, her husband, and her family, and she dies with a broken heart...but...after all, never any creature lost a dearer wife." Only two of their children survived into adulthood: Roger (who survived his father by just three months) and Margery, an 'addle-headed and stubborn' child (her cousin, Nicholas L'Estrange, writing of "Her ignorant, rude and ill-behviour both to her father and to myself" in 1700). In February 1702 (N.S. 1703) her father wrote to a friend, Sir Christopher Calthorpe, concerning the departure of Margery from the Church of England to the church of Rome: "It wounds the very heart of me, for I do solemnly protest in the presence of Almighty God that I knew nothing of it. As I was born and brought up in the communion of the church of England, so I have been true to it ever since, with a firm resolution with God's assistance to continue in the same to my life's end."

== Legacy ==
L'Estrange has evaded sustained scholarly attention until recently. Until an essay anthology used his life and works as a way to explore wider issues of Restoration culture and politics, he had not received much attention in his own right. The one full-length biography used L'Estrange as a vehicle for a study into the 17th-century press, rather than as a character study of one of the few figures to be involved in English politics from the Civil War to the Glorious Revolution. His biographer, George Kitchin, argued that L'Estrange's works had no literary merit beyond as an example of vitriolic ranting taken to an art form. He followed the Whig historian Thomas Babington Macaulay who characterised L'Estrange as little more than a bully and apologist for the Restoration court with a talent for abuse.

== Notes ==
Parliament of England
Preceded by James Annesley and Sir John Cloberry	Member of Parliament for Winchester; 1685–1687; With: Charles Hanses	Succeeded by Lord William Powlett and Francis Morley
