= John Wallwork =

John Wallwork may refer to:

- John Wallwork (aviator)
- John Wallwork (surgeon)
