= John Wallwork (aviator) =

John Wilson Wallwork
- Born: 1898; Radcliffe, Lancashire, England
- Died: 18 December 1922 (aged 23–24)
- Burial place: St Mary, Radcliffe, Lancashire; 53°33′51″N 2°18′29″W
- Military career
- Allegiance: United Kingdom
- Branch: British Army; Royal Air Force
- Service years: 1917–1922
- Rank: Flying officer
- Unit: No. 40 Squadron RFC/RAF
- Conflicts: World War I • Western Front
- Awards: Military Cross

Flying Officer John Wilson Wallwork MC (1898 – 18 December 1922) was a British World War I flying ace credited with five aerial victories.

== Biography ==
Wallwork was born Radcliffe, Lancashire, the son of James and Marian Stuart Wallwork.

He was commissioned from cadet to temporary second lieutenant (on probation) on the General List to serve in the Royal Flying Corps on 20 April 1917, and appointed a flying officer and confirmed in his rank on 15 July. Wallwork was posted to No. 40 Squadron RFC to fly the S.E.5a single-seat fighter, and gained his first aerial victory on 6 March 1918. He gained two more on 9 March and another on the 24th. His fifth and final victory, which made him an ace, came on 12 April 1918.

He was subsequently awarded the Military Cross, which was gazetted on 23 July 1918. His citation read:

Lieutenant John Wilson Wallwork, RAF.

"For conspicuous gallantry and devotion to duty. During recent operations he participated in many offensive low-flying and bombing attacks, and carried them out with great courage and determination. From very low altitudes he bombed enemy troops and transport, inflicting heavy casualties. He caused, while on offensive patrol, more than one enemy machine to crash, and brought down others out of control. He set a magnificent example of courage and skill."

=== List of aerial victories ===
Combat record
No.	Date/Time	Aircraft/ Serial No.	Opponent	Result	Location
1	6 March 1918 @ 1620	S.E.5a (C1068)	Albatros D.V	Destroyed	North-west of Lens
2	9 March 1918 @ 1155	S.E.5a (C1068)	Albatros D.V	Out of control	South of Pont-à-Vendin
3	9 March 1918 @ 1615	S.E.5a (C1068)	Albatros D.V	Out of control	Henin-Liétard
4	24 March 1918 @ 1030	S.E.5a (C1068)	Fokker Dr.I	Out of control	Croiselles
5	12 April 1918 @ 1730	S.E.5a (D3510)	Pfalz D.III	Out of control	Béthune

== Post-war career ==
Wallwork was granted a short service commission in the Royal Air Force with the rank of flying officer on 24 October 1919.

In the 1922 annual RAF air display at Hendon Aerodrome Wallwork took part in an air race between various types of aircraft, from the Sopwith Pup single-seat fighter to the Vickers Vimy twin-engined heavy bomber, in which he flew a prototype Westland Weasel two-seater. The eventual winner was another prototype, the Avro 549 Aldershot, with Wallwork coming second, closely followed by Flight Lieutenant A. H. Orlebar, in another Weasel.

Wallwork died on 18 December 1922 from injuries sustained after the Gloster Nightjar that he was delivering to the Aeroplane and Armament Experimental Establishment suffered an engine failure, and crashed at Brockworth, Gloucestershire. He was buried in the churchyard of St Mary, Radcliffe, on 22 December 1922.
