= Radcliffe Cricket Club =

English cricket team

Radcliffe Cricket Club are an English cricket team currently playing in Radcliffe, Bury, Greater Manchester in the Greater Manchester Cricket League. There are no junior teams.
