= Radcliffe Town Hall =

Municipal building in Radcliffe, Greater Manchester, England

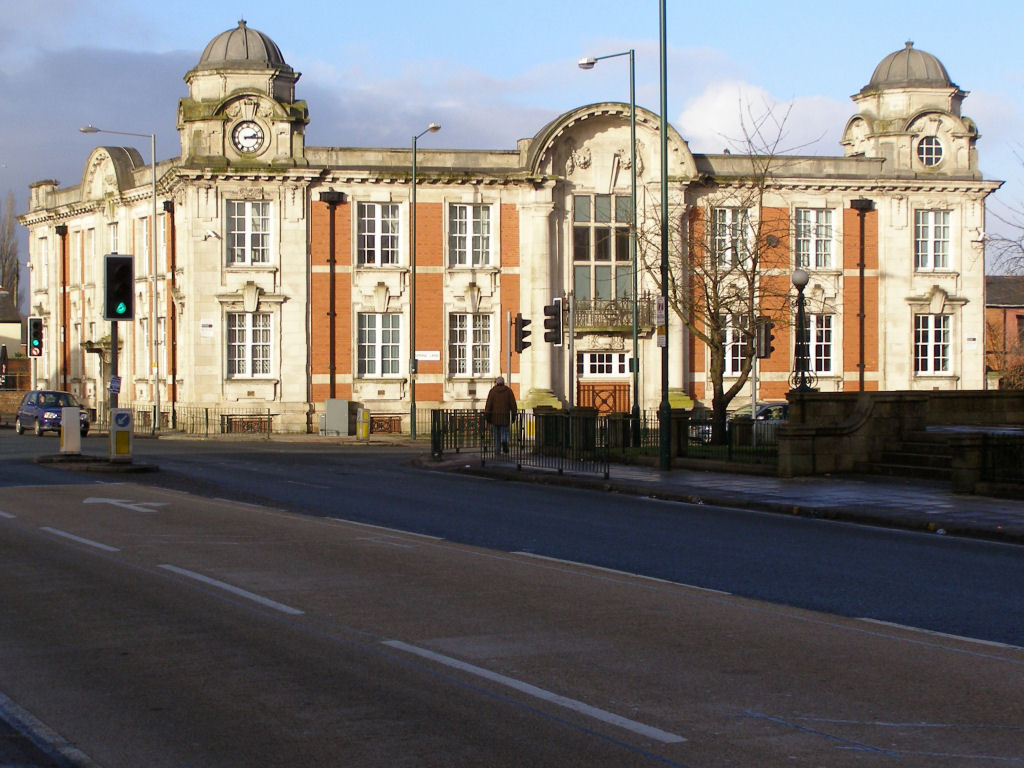
- Radcliffe Town Hall

- Shown in Greater Manchester
- 53.5628°N 2.3283°W
- Location: Spring Lane, Radcliffe

History
- Built: 1911

Site notes
- Architect(s): W. M. Gillow and R. Holt
- Architectural style: Edwardian Baroque style

Radcliffe Town Hall is a municipal structure in Spring Lane in Radcliffe, Greater Manchester, England. The town hall, which was the headquarters of Radcliffe Borough Council, is a locally listed building.

== History ==
Following significant population growth, largely associated with the textile, bleaching and mining industries, the local board of health, which had been formed in July 1866, established offices at the corner of Spring Lane and Water Street. The area became an urban district in 1895, and, in the early 20th century, the new council held its meetings in a room at the public baths in Whittaker Street after the baths had been completed in 1899. Finding this arrangement inadequate, civic leaders decided to demolish the old local board offices and to erect a new building on the same site.

The new building was designed by W. M. Gillow and R. Holt in the Edwardian Baroque style, built in red brick with stone dressings at a cost of £15,000 and was completed in 1911. The design involved a symmetrical main frontage with seven bays facing onto Spring Lane with the end bays slightly projected forwards as towers; the central bay, which also slightly projected forward, featured a curved iron balcony and a tall nine-light window on the first floor, flanked by full-height Doric order columns supporting a modillioned segmental pediment containing a keystone and garlands in the tympanum. The left hand tower featured a segmental pediment containing a clock with a dome above, while the right hand tower featured a segmental pediment containing an oculus with a dome above. Internally, the principal room was the council chamber, with a public gallery, on the first floor.

A war memorial in the form of an obelisk flanked by bronze statues, which was designed by Sydney March and built by F. M. & H. Nuttall, was unveiled across the road from the town hall on 26 November 1922. The area was advanced to the status of municipal borough with the town hall as its headquarters in 1935. The town hall continued to serve as the headquarters of Radcliffe Borough Council for much of the 20th century, but ceased to be the local seat of government when the enlarged Bury Metropolitan Borough Council was formed in 1974. There was some controversy in 1978 when Bury Council chose not to include the building on a list of 76 local buildings recommended for inclusion on the National Heritage List for England.

The condition of the vacant building deteriorated to such an extent that it was offered for sale for a nominal sum in December 1996. It was acquired by the North British Housing Association in July 1997, and, following conversion, it was reopened as private accommodation for homeless families in February 1999.
