= Outwood Viaduct =

Bridge in Bury, Greater Manchester, England

Coordinates: 53.5568°N 2.3316°W

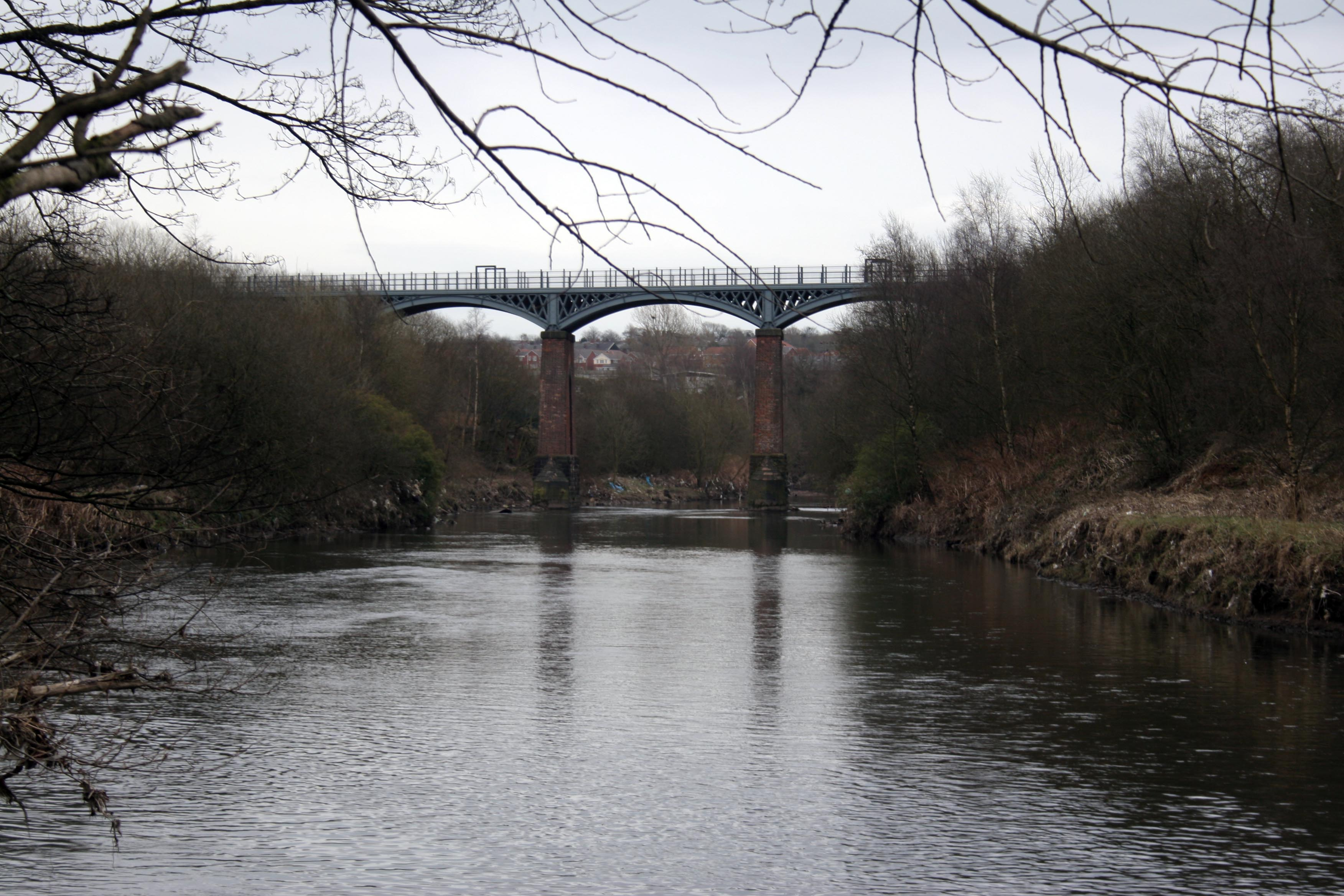
The west side; Radcliffe is to the left.

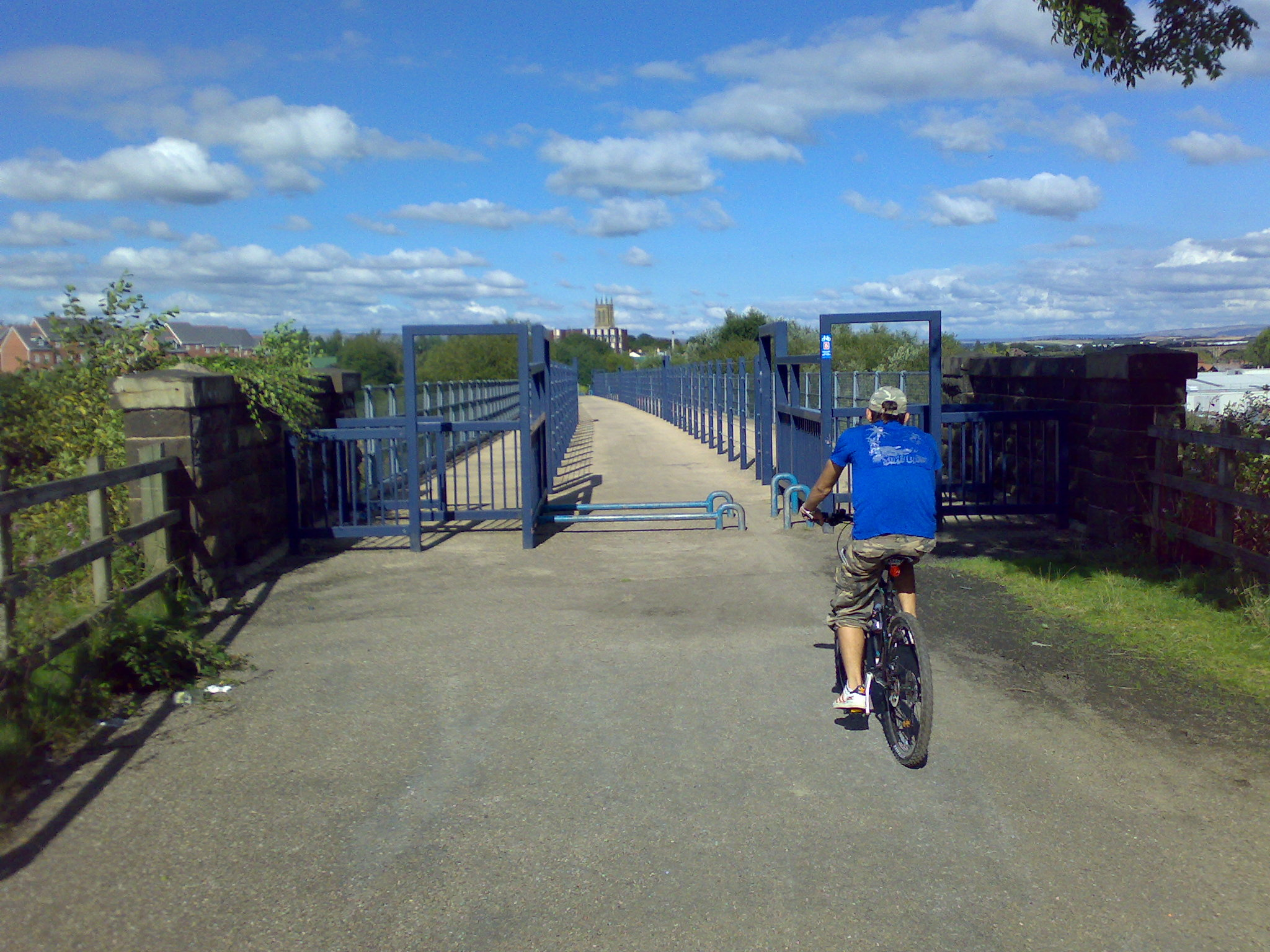
The viaduct has long since ceased to carry trains.

Outwood Viaduct is a former railway bridge over the River Irwell near Radcliffe, in Greater Manchester, north-west England. It opened in 1846 as a timber structure and was rebuilt in cast iron in 1881. It closed to trains in 1966. Following a period of disuse, it was restored for use by pedestrians and cyclists and re-opened in 1999.

== History ==
The viaduct was first built in timber for the Manchester, Bury and Rossendale Railway, which was amalgamated into the East Lancashire Railway by the time of opening. The timber viaduct opened on 25 September 1846. It was built to carry the Clifton Junction to Bury line over the River Irwell. The closest station was Radcliffe Bridge, heading southwest to Clifton the following station was Ringley Road. In 1881, the superstructure was rebuilt for the Lancashire and Yorkshire Railway in cast iron from Andrew Handyside and Company of Derby. The timber deck was replaced by the London, Midland and Scottish Railway (the result of further amalgamations) in 1923. The railway closed in 1966 and the bridge fell into disuse. It was a very late use of cast-iron arches; by the time of its construction, cast iron had fallen out of favour for railway bridges and other materials had been developed.

The bridge was restored as part of a project to reclaim disused industrial land for community use and converted into a walking and cycling trail. It was re-opened on 25 June 1999 by Sir William McAlpine, the president of the Railway Heritage Trust. It is now owned by Bury Metropolitan Borough Council.

== Description ==
The viaduct is 112 yards (102 metres) long and reaches a maximum height of 60 feet (18 metres) above the Irwell. It consists of five segmental arches in cast iron, each with a 60 feet (18 metres) span. Each arch consists of six ribs, held together by bracing. The inner four arches directly supported the rails, meaning that the weight of trains was transferred straight to the arches rather than through a traditional bridge deck. This allowed for a lightweight timber deck. The spandrels (the space between the arches and the bridge deck) contain decorative iron latticework. The arches are supported on brick piers which appear to be original from the 1840s. The piers contain round relieving arches and the two in the water have stone bases which are fitted with cutwaters.

== See also ==
- Listed buildings in Radcliffe, Greater Manchester
