= Elliot Pilkington =

English footballer

Personal information
- Full name: Elliot Pilkington
- Date of birth: 2 April 1890
- Place of birth: Radcliffe, England
- Date of death: 1979 (aged 83–84)
- Position: Half-back

Senior career*
Years	Team	Apps	(Gls)
1907–1908	Radcliffe St Thomas's		
1908–1909	Rossendale United		
1909–1910	Salford United		
1911–1926	Oldham Athletic	269	(14)
1926–1927	Llandudno		
1927	Macclesfield		
Total		269	(14)
- * Club domestic league appearances and goals

Elliot Pilkington (2 April 1890 – 1979) was an English footballer who played in the Football League for Oldham Athletic.
