= Radcliffe Cenotaph =

War memorial in Greater Manchester, England

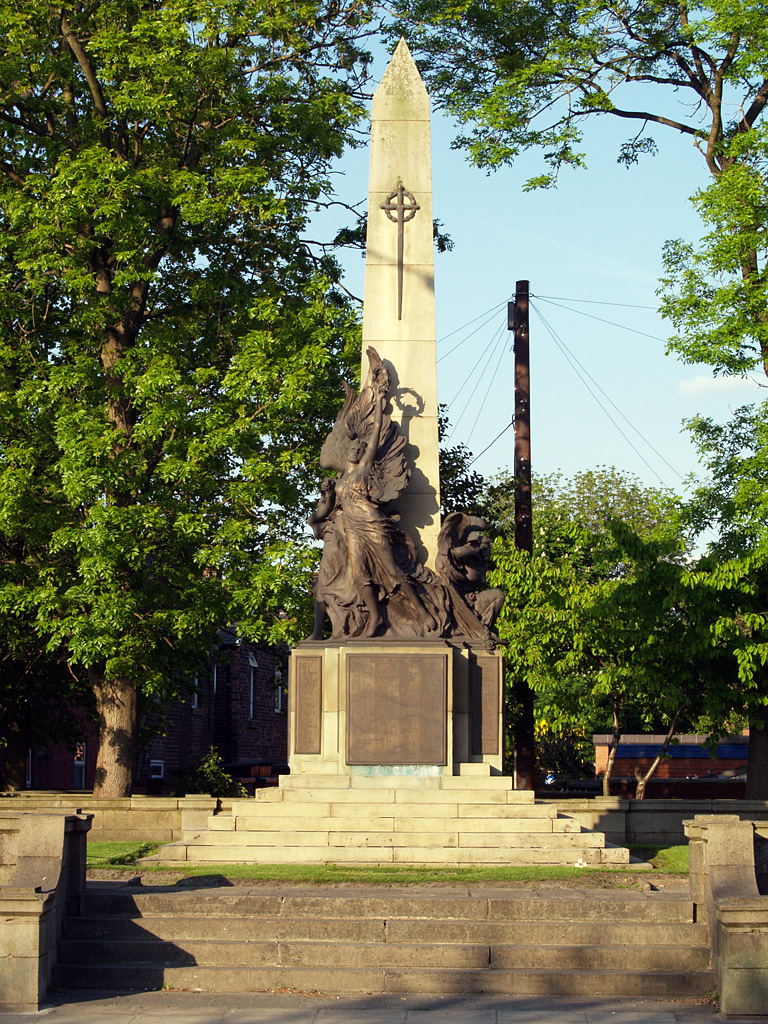
- The war memorial in 2008

- Location within Greater Manchester

General information
- Location: Blackburn Street, Radcliffe, Greater Manchester, England
- Coordinates: 53.5624°N 2.3280°W
- Year built: 1922; 104 years ago

Technical details
- Material: Darley Dale sandstone

Design and construction
- Architect: Sydney March
- Architecture firm: March Bros.
- Main contractor: F. M. & H. Nuttall Ltd.

Listed Building – Grade II*
- Official name: Radcliffe War Memorial
- Designated: 10 March 1992
- Reference no.: 1067192

Radcliffe Cenotaph is a Grade II* listed war memorial on Blackburn Street in Radcliffe, a market town within the Metropolitan Borough of Bury, Greater Manchester, England. It commemorates the men and women of Radcliffe who lost their lives during the First and Second World Wars.

== History ==
The cenotaph was commissioned after the First World War to honour local servicemen who died in the conflict. It was designed by Sydney March of March Bros., Farnborough, Kent, with the site layout by A. Baines Barker of London. The stonework was executed by F. M. & H. Nuttall Ltd of Whitefield. The memorial was unveiled on 26 November 1922 at a cost of approximately £5,000. Additional plaques for the Second World War were added later, and a rededication ceremony took place on 30 April 1949.

On 10 March 1992, Radcliffe Cenotaph was designated a Grade II* listed building.

=== Private James Hutchinson VC ===
As part of a national initiative to honour First World War Victoria Cross recipients, a commemorative stone dedicated to Private James Hutchinson VC (1895–1972) was installed at the cenotaph in 2016. Hutchinson, a Radcliffe native who served with the 2/5th Battalion, The Lancashire Fusiliers (55th (West Lancashire) Division), was awarded the Victoria Cross for exceptional bravery during a trench raid near Ficheux, France, on 28 June 1916. The stone was unveiled during a public ceremony attended by his family, local residents, and civic representatives, featuring a parade and formal tributes.

== Location ==
The cenotaph stands in a formal memorial garden opposite the former Radcliffe Town Hall, on Blackburn Street (A665) between Spring Lane and Heber Street. The garden is enclosed by low walls and railings, with Art Deco wrought iron lamp standards at the corners.

== Design ==
The memorial takes the form of an obelisk made from Darley Dale sandstone, rising to approximately 10.7 metres (35 feet) above street level. It is set on a square raised terrace approached by four broad steps and surrounded by ashlar walls. The base consists of seven steps leading to a cruciform pedestal.

=== Plaques ===
Four large bronze panels on the main faces list 642 names of those who died during the First World War. Narrow re-entrant sides carry rectangular panels commemorating those who died in the Second World War. A bronze cartouche on the rear bears the inscription: "TO OUR GLORIOUS DEAD 1914–1918" along with the Radcliffe coat of arms.

=== Sculptural elements ===
Three large bronze statues represent Victory, Liberty, and Peace. Victory stands centrally, holding a laurel wreath aloft and clasping Liberty's hand. Liberty raises a flaming torch, while Peace reclines with roses of remembrance and a dove resting on her shoulder.

== Gallery ==
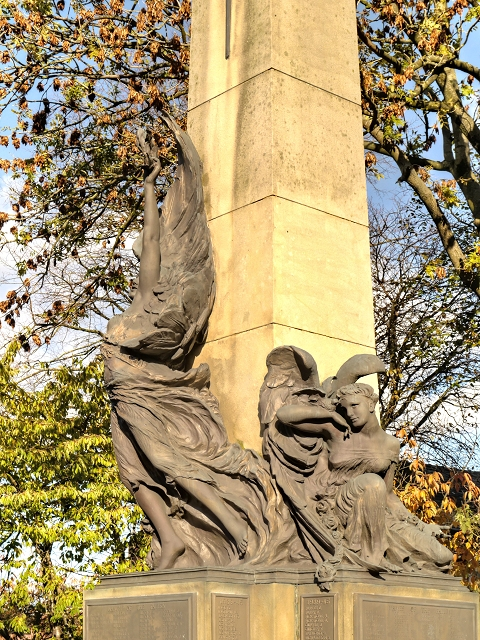
Statues of Victory and Peace

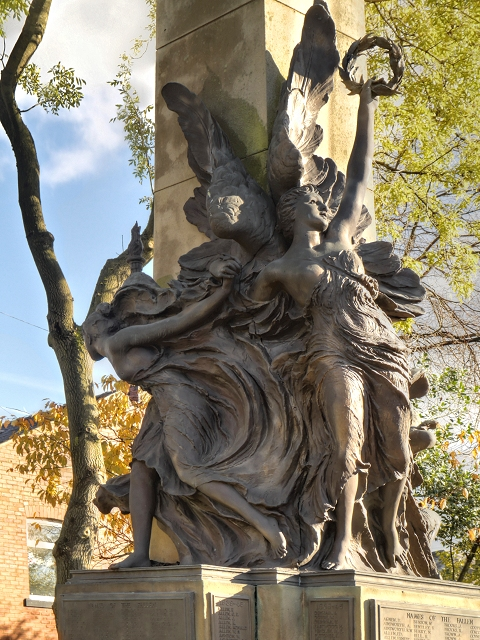
Statues of Liberty and Victory

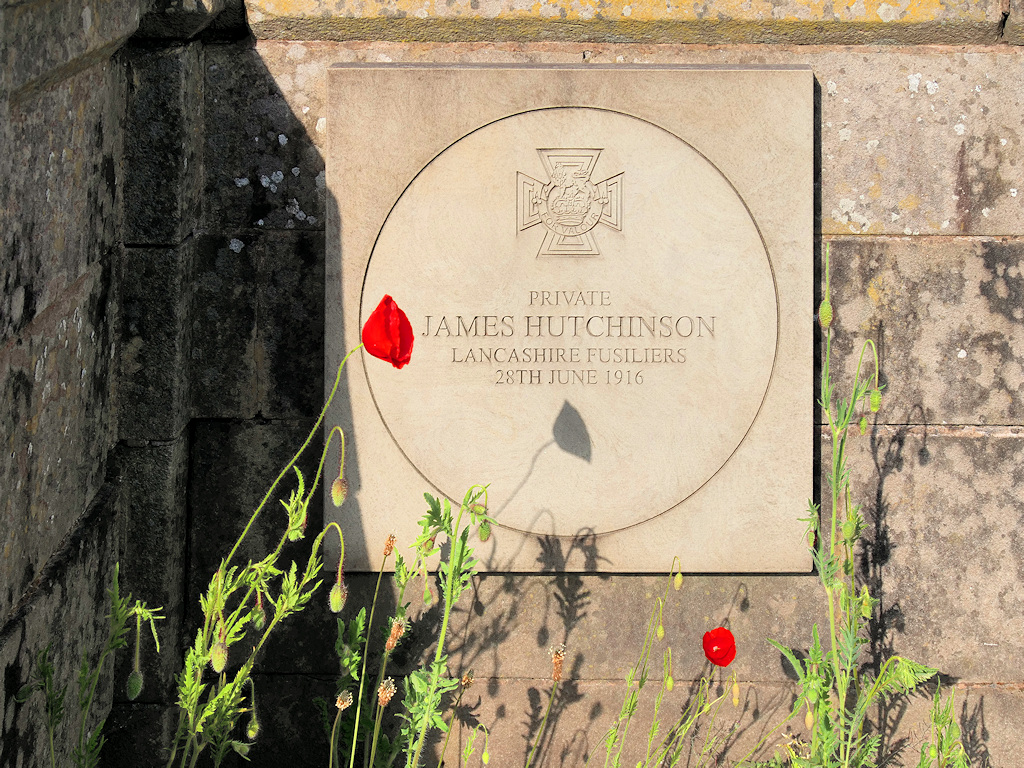
Memorial stone for James Hutchinson VC

== See also ==
- Grade II* listed buildings in Greater Manchester
- Listed buildings in Radcliffe, Greater Manchester
