= Don McAllister =

English footballer (born 1953)

Personal information
- Full name: Donald McAllister
- Date of birth: 26 May 1953 (age 73)
- Place of birth: Radcliffe, Lancashire, England
- Height: 5 ft 10 in (1.78 m)
- Position: Central defender

Senior career*
Years	Team	Apps	(Gls)
1970–1975	Bolton Wanderers	156	(2)
1975–1981	Tottenham Hotspur	172	(9)
1977	→ Washington Diplomats (loan)	25	(0)
1981–1983	Charlton Athletic	55	(6)
1984	Tampa Bay Rowdies	1	(0)
1984	Rochdale	3	(0)
Total		412	(17)

Managerial career
- 1985–1986: Barnet
- * Club domestic league appearances and goals

Donald McAllister (born 26 May 1953) is an English former professional footballer who played as a central defender for Bolton Wanderers, Tottenham Hotspur, Charlton Athletic, Tampa Bay Rowdies and Rochdale.

== Football career ==
McAllister joined local club Bolton Wanderers as an apprentice in June 1970. He played on 156 occasions including one as substitute and scoring twice.

He signed for Tottenham Hotspur in February 1975 in a £80,000 transfer deal where he went on to make 209 appearances including five as sub and scoring ten goals in all competitions.

During his career at the club he was a member of the 1977 relegation side and the 1978 team that won promotion and played a part in the FA Cup winning squad of 1980–81.

In the summer of 1977, he went on loan to the Washington Diplomats of the North American Soccer League.

McAllister joined Charlton Athletic in August 1981, where he featured in 55 matches and netted six goals.

In 1984, he played one game for the Tampa Bay Rowdies. He finished his career at Rochdale after a further three appearances.

== After football ==
McAllister emigrated to Sydney, Australia, where he worked as a finance manager for many years. He is now retired and relocated to Queensland in late 2015.
