= Listed buildings in Radcliffe, Greater Manchester =

Radcliffe is a town in the Metropolitan Borough of Bury, Greater Manchester, England, and includes the village of Ainsworth and the countryside around and between them. It is unparished, and contains 31 listed buildings that are recorded in the National Heritage List for England. Of these, two are listed at Grade I, the highest of the three grades, three are at Grade II*, the middle grade, and the others are at Grade II, the lowest grade. The listed buildings include farmhouses and farm buildings, private houses, churches and associated items, a ruined pele tower, a public house, two structures associated with the demolished Mount Sion Mill, a disused railway viaduct, and a war memorial.

== Key ==
Grade	Criteria
I	Buildings of exceptional interest, sometimes considered to be internationally important
II*	Particularly important buildings of more than special interest
II	Buildings of national importance and special interest

== Buildings ==
Name and location	Photograph	Date	Notes	Grade
Church of St Mary and St Bartholomew; 53.56448°N 2.30811°W		14th century	The church was altered during the following centuries, the tower is dated 1665, the chancel was rebuilt in 1817, and extensions and restoration were carried out in 1870 and in 1905 by J. Medland Taylor. The church consists of a nave with a clerestory, a north aisle with a transept, a south aisle, a chancel with a north vestry and a south chapel, and a west tower. The tower has clock faces and an embattled parapet with corner pinnacles.	I
Radcliffe Tower; 53.56383°N 2.30978°W		1403	This is a ruined pele tower, and all that remains of a former manor house. It is in stone, and measures 10.5 yards (9.6 m) by 19 yards (17 m), and is about 20 feet (6.1 m) tall. There are almost-round-headed arches on three sides, and a doorway on the other side. The tower is also a scheduled monument.	I
Dearden Fold Farmhouse; 53.58753°N 2.36648°W	—	16th century (probable)	Originally a hall with cross-wings, the farmhouse is timber framed with stone walls and some brown brick, and with a stone slab roof. There are two storeys and four bays, the outer bays slightly projecting and gabled. On the front is a gabled porch, and the windows are replacement casements. Inside is an inglenook and a timber framed cross-wall.	II*
Barrack Fold Farmhouse, stable and barn 53.59550°N 2.36069°W	—	17th century	The buildings are in sandstone and brick, the house and stable have roofs of stone-slate, and the barn has a Welsh slate roof. The farmhouse has two storeys, two bays and a gabled cross-wing on the right. The doorway has a dated and inscribed lintel, and the windows are mullioned. The barn to the north has a cart entrance with a timber lintel and quoined jambs; the other cart entrance is blocked. The other openings are doors, windows, and ventilation holes in diamond patterns. The stable block is attached at right angles to the barn.	II
Coggra Fold Farmhouse; 53.57471°N 2.35952°W	—	17th century	A stone house, partly rebuilt in brick, with two storeys and an L-shaped plan. At the end of the shorter wing is a massive projecting chimney with a decoration of a tree and other objects in plaster.	II
Scotson Fold Farmhouse; 53.55923°N 2.33794°W	—	17th century (or earlier)	The farmhouse is timber framed with later brick infill on a stone plinth. It has 2 1/2 storeys and three bays, and contains two windows with modern glazing.	II
Tythe Barn; 53.56487°N 2.31071°W	—	17th century (or earlier)	The barn, later used for other purposes, is in stone, partly rendered and has a stone slab roof. There is a cart entrance in the centre, and a window to the right.	II
Barn, Dearden Fold Farm; 53.58766°N 2.36670°W	—	1691	The barn is in stone with quoins and a stone slab roof. It has two cart doors with depressed-arched heads, and a doorway with a dated and initialled lintel.	II
Smith Fold Farmhouse; 53.57900°N 2.36975°W	—	17th or early 18th century	A stone farmhouse with a slate roof, two storeys and three bays. In the right bay is a gabled porch, and the windows are mullioned.	II
Presbyterian Chapel, Ainsworth; 53.58895°N 2.35958°W		1715	The chapel was enlarged in 1773 and altered and repaired in 1845. It is in stone with quoins, and has two storeys and four bays. Above the doorway is a pediment with an inscription, and along the sides are two tiers of chamfered mullioned windows. On the west gable is a double bellcote with Ionic pilasters and capitals with carved faces. Inside the chapel are box pews and a gallery on three sides.	II*
Barn, Davenport Farm; 53.59100°N 2.36532°W	—	1723	The barn, later converted for other uses, is in stone with the north wall partly rebuilt in brick, and has a slate roof. There are three doorways, and in the gable end is a shield with a foliated border, inscribed with initials and the date.	II
Gate piers, Old Hall Farm; 53.57804°N 2.31958°W	—	Early 18th century (probable)	The gate piers are in rusticated stone, and have ball finials.	II
Old Hall Farmhouse; 53.57794°N 2.31923°W	—	Early 18th century	The farmhouse was refronted after a fire in 1872. It is in red brick with quoins, a sill band, a moulded gutter cornice, and a slate roof. There are two storeys, five bays, and a recessed two-bay extension on the right. The windows are sashes, and above the door is a fanlight.	II
Duke William Inn; 53.58883°N 2.35983°W		1737	The public house probably contains earlier material. It is in stone with two storeys and has a symmetrical front of two bays. There are quoins on the corners and around the openings. The windows are sashes, and above the doorway is a keystone. At the rear is a stable forming a wing; it is in red brick and has a stone slab roof.	II
Boundary wall, Christ Church; 53.58784°N 2.35897°W	—	18th century (probable or earlier)	The wall runs along the north side of the churchyard of Christ Church, and the upper parts probably date from the 19th century. It is in stone, about 5 feet (1.5 m) tall, and has peaked coping.	II
Stand Lodge; 53.55360°N 2.31724°W	—	18th century (probable)	A brick house that was later extended, with a sill band, a bracketed eaves cornice, and a slate roof with coped gables. There are two storeys and six bays. On the front is an iron trellis-work porch, and the windows are sashes. To the left and recessed is a two-bay extension dating from about 1850, with two bay windows, and there are other extensions at the rear.	II
Three tombs 53.58872°N 2.35960°W	—	18th century	The tombs are in the churchyard of the Presbyterian Chapel, and consist of three panelled chest tombs.	II
Remains of stocks 53.58782°N 2.35932°W	—	1753	The probable stocks are on each side of the pathway in the churchyard of Christ Church. What remains consists of weathered inscribed stone posts with slots in the inner faces, that are no longer in their original position.	II
Hook's Cottage; 53.58903°N 2.35892°W	—	1773	A stone cottage with a slate roof, two storeys and two bays. The windows have chamfered mullions, and above the door is a dated and initialled lintel.	II
Barn, Coggra Fold Farm; 53.57501°N 2.35962°W	—	Late 18th century	The barn is in stone in its lower parts and in brick above, and has a stone-slab roof. It contains segmental-headed cart entrances, the one on the side of the road being blocked.	II
Former Chapel; 53.58912°N 2.35944°W	—	Late 18th century	The chapel, later converted for residential use, is in stone. It has three storeys and a 20th-century wing at the rear. The windows are mullioned, and on the ground floor they have hood moulds. Above the door is a large lintel, and to its right is a mounting block.	II
Woodley; 53.55019°N 2.31366°W	—	Late 18th century	A red brick house with moulded eaves, and a hipped slate roof. It has a symmetrical front of five bays, and there is a projecting extension at the left. On the front is an arched doorway with Tuscan columns and a cornice hood, and the windows are sashes.	II
Water-powered beam pump 53.55528°N 2.35123°W		Early 19th century	The pump served the now-demolished Mount Sion Mill. It consists of two sandstone pillars flanking a wheelpit and holding the cast iron mechanism for the rods attached to the waterwheel.	II
Christ Church, Ainsworth; 53.58755°N 2.35892°W		1831–32	The church was rebuilt on the site of a previous church. It is in stone, and in Gothic Revival style. The church consists of a nave, a north transept, a short chancel and a west tower. The tower has an embattled parapet, and the windows in the body of the church are lancets. Inside the church is a west gallery, and much of the furniture was originally in Bury Parish Church.	II
St Thomas' Church; 53.56127°N 2.32624°W		1862–1864	The church is in stone, in Perpendicular style, and the tower was completed in 1871–72. The church consists of a nave with a clerestory, north and south aisles, a chancel with north and south vestries, and a west tower. The tower has three stages, clock faces, corner pinnacles and an embattled parapet; The nave and chancel are also embattled. At the west end of the aisles are stair windows leading to a west gallery.	II
Holly Bank; 53.58765°N 2.35951°W	—	Late 19th century	A stone house, possibly originally a vicarage, with a band and a slate roof. It has two storeys and three bays. On the front is a porch with slender Tuscan columns and a door with a rectangular fanlight, and the windows are sashes.	II
Mount Sion steam crane 53.55751°N 2.35265°W		Latter half of the 19th century	The steam crane stands by the Manchester, Bolton and Bury Canal and served the now-demolished Mount Sion Mill. It is almost entirely in cast iron and mounted on a rectangular stone plinth.	II
St Andrew's Church; 53.57409°N 2.33750°W		1875–1877	The church is in stone, and consists of a nave with a clerestory, north and south porches, north and south lean-to aisles, north and south transepts, a chancel with an apse, and northwest steeple. The steeple has a three-stage tower, corner pinnacles, and a spire. The west windows has five lights.	II
Outwood Viaduct; 53.55672°N 2.33164°W		1881	The viaduct was built by the Lancashire and Yorkshire Railway to cross the valley of the River Irwell. It is now disused and has been converted into a footpath. The viaduct has five cast iron arches carried on brick pillars capped in stone, and there are brick abutments. The two pillars in the river have cutwaters.	II
Stand United Reformed Church; 53.55119°N 2.31436°W		1885	The church, in Decorated style, is in sandstone with slate roofs. It consists of a nave with a clerestory and porches, north and south aisles, a chancel, and a southeast steeple. The steeple has a four-stage tower a clock face, crocketed finials, and a broach spire with lucarnes.	II
War memorial 53.56245°N 2.32802°W		1922	The war memorial was designed by Sydney March and is in Darley Dale sandstone. It consists of an obelisk on a cruciform pedestal on a square base of seven steps, its top being 35 feet (11 m) above street level. On the sides are bronze panels with the names of those lost in the two world wars, and on the front is a sword and a wreath. Around the base of the obelisk are three bronze winged female figures representing Liberty, Victory and Peace. The monument stands on a terrace approached by four steps flanked by walls with bronze lamp standards, and the whole is in a garden surrounded by low walls.	II*
