= Parish Church of St Mary, Radcliffe =

St Mary, Radcliffe
- Parish Church of St Mary, Radcliffe
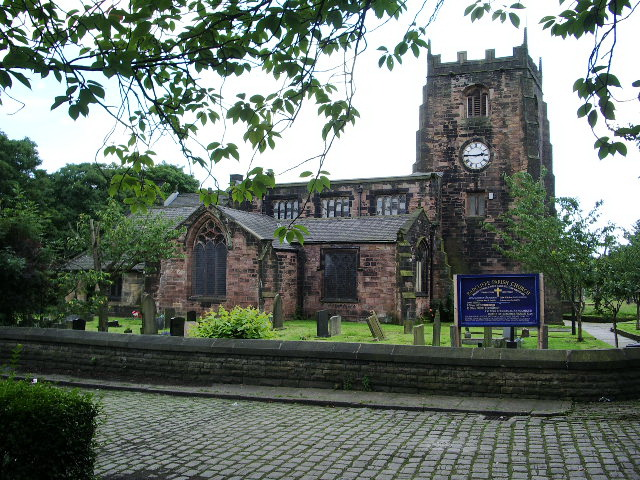

- Location within Greater Manchester
- 53.564428°N 2.308084°W
- OS grid reference: SD 79691 07580
- Location: Radcliffe, Greater Manchester
- Country: England
- Denomination: Church of England
- Churchmanship: Central

History
- Former name(s): Church of St Mary and St Bartholomew

Architecture
- Completed: 14th century

Administration
- Province: Province of York
- Diocese: Diocese of Manchester

Clergy
- Vicar: The Revd Carol Hayden

The Parish Church of St Mary, Radcliffe is a church in Radcliffe, Greater Manchester. It was built during the 14th century, but the tower was not added until the 15th century. The building is designated Grade I by English Heritage, having been listed in 1966 under its former name of the Church of St Mary and St Bartholomew. In 1991, some local parishes were merged, and the church adopted its present name.

The churchyard contains the war graves of six soldiers of World War I and three of World War II.

== Conservation ==
The church roof was restored in 2008–09, at a cost of £250,000.

On Boxing Day 2015 the church was inundated by flood waters so badly that the church was unapproachable until the Monday 28 December. The flooding caused thousands of pounds worth of damage, including damage to many cherished artefacts.

== See also ==
- List of churches in Greater Manchester
- Grade I listed churches in Greater Manchester
- Listed buildings in Radcliffe, Greater Manchester
