= Greater Manchester Cricket League =

Cricket league in Greater Manchester, Lancashire, England

- Countries: England
- Format: Limited Overs
- First edition: 2015 (Founded); 2023 (ECB Premier League)
- Tournament format: League
- Number of teams: 12 (Premier League 1)
- Current champion: Brooksbottom CC
- Most successful: Prestwich (3 titles)
- Website: https://gtrmcrcricket.play-cricket.com/

The Greater Manchester Cricket League (GMCL) is an amateur recreational cricket league in Lancashire, England, established in 2016.

The league company, Greater Manchester Cricket League Ltd, was officially incorporated on 19 June 2015. Play officially began on 16 April 2016, featuring 53 clubs across four main divisions plus lower regional tiers. It drew clubs from various older leagues (such as the Lancashire and Cheshire League and the North Manchester Cricket League) seeking a fresh structure.

Full accreditation was granted just before the start of the league's eighth playing season in March of 2023. This elevated the GMCL's top tier to the highest level of recreational amateur cricket in the national pyramid framework.

== Champions ==
- League Champions 2016–present
  Year	Club
  2016	Egerton
  2017	Flixton
  2018	Flixton
  2019	Denton St Lawrence
  2021	Prestwich
  2022	Prestwich
  2023	Roe Green
  2024	Edgworth
  2025	Prestwich
  2026	Brooksbottom

=== Championships won ===
- League Championship
  Wins	Club
  3	Prestwich
  2	Flixton
  1	Brooksbottom
  1	Denton St Lawrence
  1	Edgworth
  1	Egerton
  1	Roe Green

== Performance by season from 2016 ==
Key
Gold	Champions
Blue	Left League
Red	Relegated

Premier Division performance by season, from 2016
Club	2016	2017	2018	2019	2021	2022	2023	2024	2025	2026
Bamford Fieldhouse		?	12							
Bradshaw								9	12	
Brooksbottom										1
Bury	?	11								
Clifton	?	?	?	?	?	?	7	3	9	9
Denton St Lawrence	?	3	?	1	2	?	12			
Denton West	?	?	?				6	7	5	10
Edgworth	12	?					2	1	3	2
Egerton	1	9	?	?	?		9	6	7	11
Flixton	?	1	1	2	?			4	8	
Flowery Field							8	8	11	
Glodwick					?	?				
Greenfield				?	?	?				
Greenmount	?									
Heaton							3	11		
Heyside							11			
Heywood	?	?	?							
Horwich RMI									4	4
Monton				?	?					7
Moorside					?	?				
Prestwich	2	?	2	?	1	1	10		1	3
Roe Green				?	?	?	1	2	2	6
Royton	?		?	?					6	5
Shaw							4	5	10	12
Stand				?						
Unsworth	?									
Westhoughton								10		
Woodbank		2	3	?	?	2	5	12		8
Woodhouses		?	4	?						
Wythenshawe	?									
References										
