= Richard Fort =

Richard Fort may refer to:

- Richard Fort (Liberal politician, born 1822) (1822–1868), English politician, MP for Clitheroe, 1865–1868
- Richard Fort (Liberal politician, born 1856) (1856–1918), English politician, MP for Clitheroe, 1880–1885
- Richard Fort (Conservative politician) (1907–1959), English politician, MP for Clitheroe,1950–1959
