= Minuscule 553 =

- New Testament manuscript
- Text: Gospels
- Date: 13th century
- Script: Greek
- Found: 1834
- Now at: British Library
- Size: 21.8 cm by 15.8 cm
- Type: Byzantine text-type
- Category: V

Minuscule 553 (in the Gregory-Aland numbering), ε 331 (in the Soden numbering), is a Greek minuscule manuscript of the New Testament, on parchment. Palaeographically it has been assigned to the 13th century. Scrivener labelled it by number 540.

== Description ==
The codex contains a complete text of the four Gospels on 303 parchment leaves (size 21.8 cm by 15.8 cm). The writing is in one column per page, 21 lines per page.

It contains tables of the κεφαλαια, the κεφαλαια, the τιτλοι, subscriptions at the end of the Gospels, στιχοι, and faded decorations. According to Scrivener the manuscript is "extremely uninteresting".

== Text ==
The Greek text of the codex is a representative of the Byzantine text-type. Hermann von Soden classified it to the textual family K^{r}. Aland placed it in Category V. According to the Claremont Profile Method it represents the textual family K^{r} in Luke 1 and Luke 20. In Luke 10 no profile was made. It belongs to subgroup 35.

The Pericope Adulterae (John 7:53-8:11) is marked with an obelus.

== History ==
The manuscript was held in the monastery Mar Saba. In 1834 Robert Curzon, Lord Zouche, brought this manuscript to England (along with the codices 548, 552, 554). The entire collection of Curzon was bequeathed by his daughter in 1917 to the British Museum, where it had been deposited, by his son, since 1876.

The manuscripts was added to the list of the New Testament minuscule manuscripts by F. H. A. Scrivener (540) and C. R. Gregory (553).

The manuscript was examined by Scrivener, Dean Burgon, and Gregory.

It is currently housed at the British Library (Add MS 39596) in London.

== See also ==
- List of New Testament minuscules
- Biblical manuscript
- Textual criticism
