= Henry Cockayne Cust =

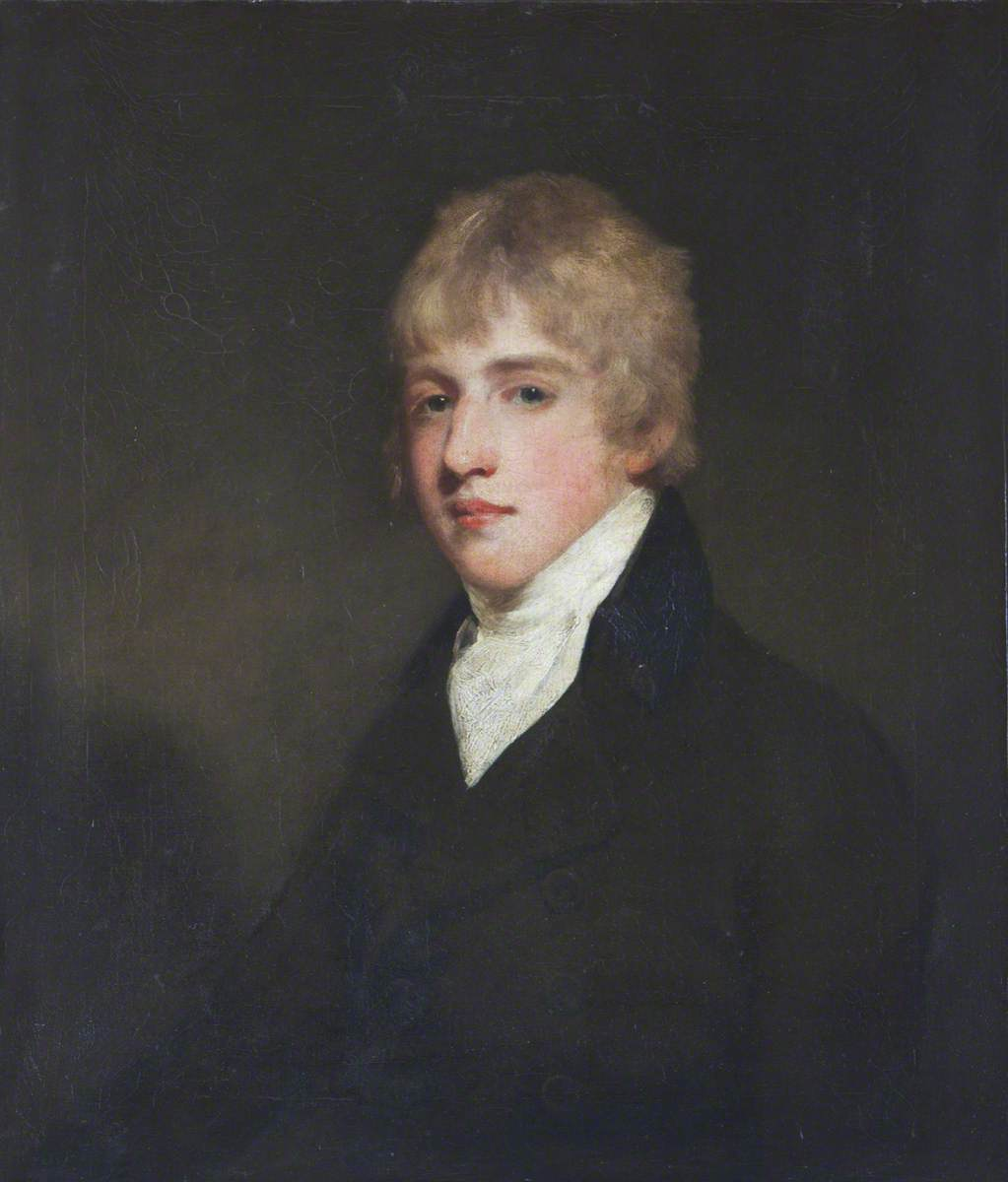
Portrait by John Hoppner, c. 1800

Rev. Canon Henry Cockayne Cust (28 September 1780 – 19 May 1861) was a Canon of Windsor from 1813 to 1861.

== Origins ==
He was a younger son of Brownlow Cust, 1st Baron Brownlow (1744–1807) by his wife Frances Bankes, a daughter of Sir Henry Bankes of Wimbledon, Surrey. His brothers included: John Cust, 1st Earl Brownlow; Peregrine Cust; Sir Edward Cust, 1st Baronet and William Cust.

== Career ==
He was educated at Trinity College, Cambridge. He was appointed Rector of Cockayne Hatley, Bedfordshire (1806) and Rector of Sywell, Northamptonshire (1806). He was appointed to the first stall in St George's Chapel, Windsor Castle in 1813, and held the stall until 1861.

== Marriage and children ==
In 1816 he married Lady Anna Maria Elizabeth Needham, a daughter of Francis Needham, 1st Earl of Kilmorey, by whom he had two sons and two daughters:

- Henry Cockayne-Cust (1819–1884), who adopted the arms and names of Cockayne, British Conservative Party politician. His children included:
  - Harry Cust (1861–1917), eldest son, politician, socialite and journalist;
  - Adelbert Cockayne-Cust, 5th Baron Brownlow (1867–1927), who having outlived his elder brother, in 1921 inherited the Brownlow barony from their childless 2nd cousin Adelbert Brownlow-Cust, 3rd Earl Brownlow, 4th Baron Brownlow;
- Robert Needham Cust (1821–1909), colonial administrator and judge;
- Sir Reginald Cust (1828–1913), barrister
- Eleanor Katherine Cust (1823–1856), who married the author Walter Scott Seton-Karr, a godson of Sir Walter Scott;
- Georgiana Anne Cust (1825–1907), who married Rev. Isaac Taylor, Canon of York.
