= William Cust =

British barrister and Member of Parliament

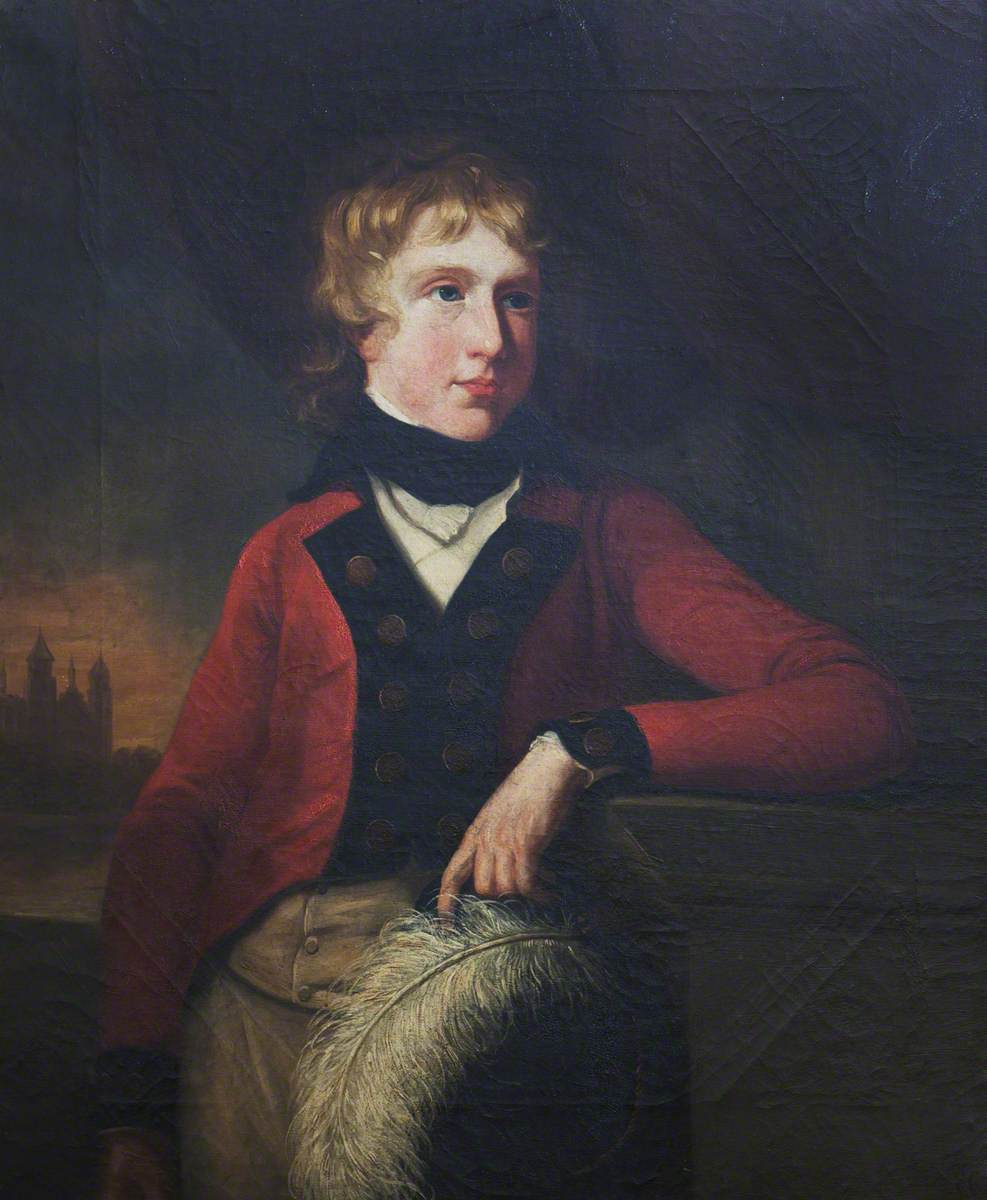
William Cust in 1805, painted by his older sister Elizabeth Cust

William Cust (23 January 1787 – 3 March 1845), was a British barrister and Member of Parliament (MP). He also served as Commissioner of Customs.

Cust was a younger son of Brownlow Cust, 1st Baron Brownlow, by Frances, daughter of Sir Henry Bankes, of Wimbledon. John Cust, 1st Earl Brownlow, Peregrine Cust, Rev. Henry Cockayne Cust and Sir Edward Cust, 1st Baronet were his brothers. He sat as Member of Parliament for Lincolnshire between 1816 and 1818 and for Clitheroe from 1818 to 1822, when he took the Chiltern Hundreds.

Cust married Sophia, daughter of Thomas Newnham, in 1819. One of their sons, the Very Reverend Arthur Purey-Cust, was Dean of York. Arthur's son Sir Herbert Edward Purey-Cust was an Admiral in the Royal Navy. William Cust died in March 1845, aged 58. His wife survived him by almost forty years and died in January 1884.

Parliament of the United Kingdom
Preceded by Charles Chaplin; Charles Anderson-Pelham	Member of Parliament for Lincolnshire; 1816–1818; With: Charles Anderson-Pelham	Succeeded by Charles Anderson-Pelham; Charles Chaplin
Preceded by Robert Curzon; Edward Wilbraham-Bootle	Member of Parliament for Clitheroe; 1818–1822; With: Robert Curzon	Succeeded by Robert Curzon; Henry Porcher
