= Brownlow Cust, 1st Baron Brownlow =

British Tory Member of Parliament

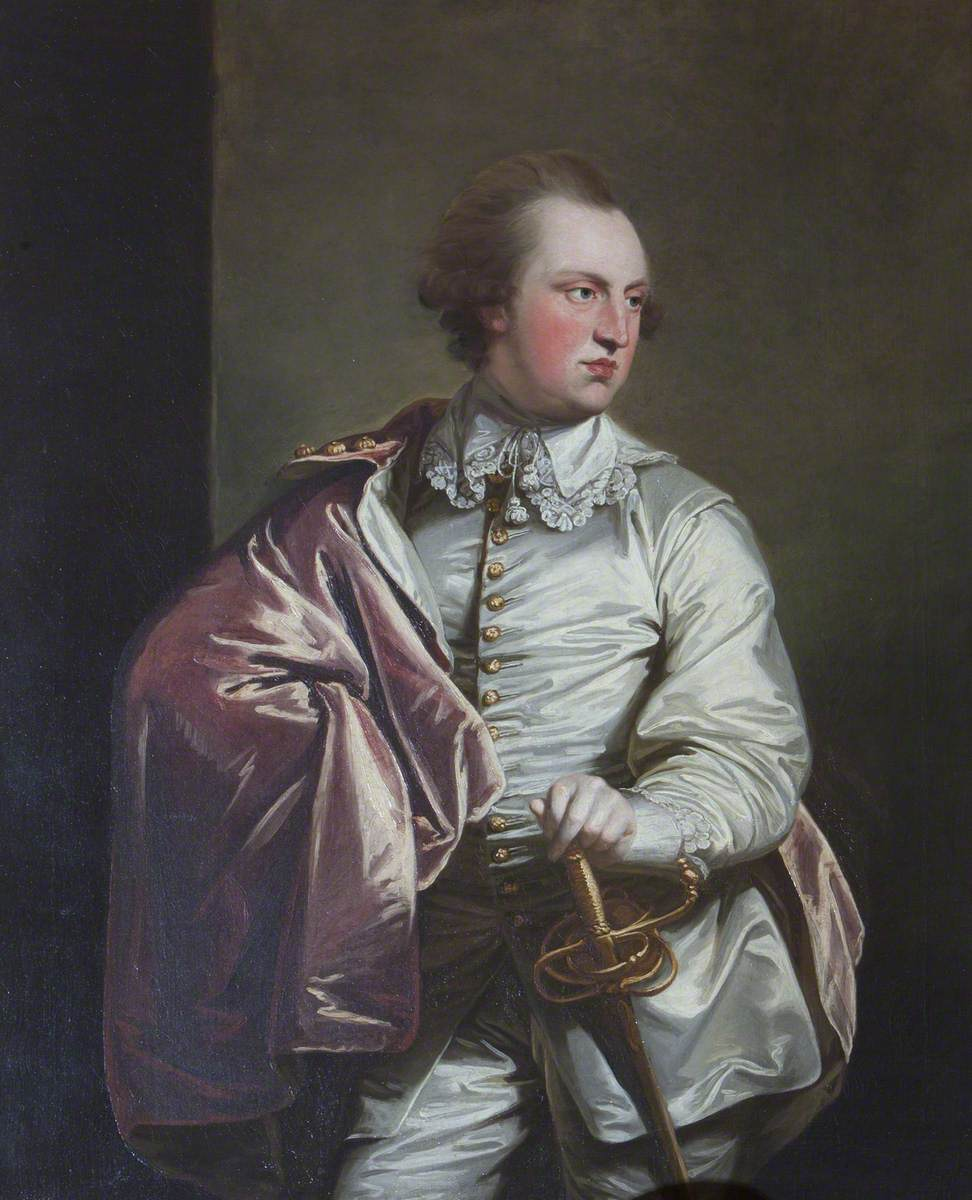
A portrait of Brownlow Cust by Francis Cotes

Brownlow Cust, 1st Baron Brownlow FRS FSA (3 December 1744 – 25 December 1807), of Belton House near Grantham in Lincolnshire (known as Sir Brownlow Cust, 4th Baronet, from 1770 to 1776), was a British Tory Member of Parliament.

== Origins ==
He was the son and heir of Sir John Cust, 3rd Baronet (1718–1770), Speaker of the House of Commons, by his wife Etheldreda Payne, a daughter of Thomas Payne of Hough-on-the-Hill, Lincolnshire.

== Career ==
Cust was educated at Eton College and Corpus Christi College, Cambridge. In 1766 he was elected as a Member of Parliament for Ilchester in Somerset, a seat he held until 1774, and then represented Grantham between 1774 and 1776, in which year he was raised to the peerage as Baron Brownlow, "of Belton in the County of Lincoln". The peerage was chiefly in recognition of his father's services, and the name of his title refers to his paternal grandmother Anne Brownlow (Lady Cust), sister and heiress in her issue of John Brownlow, 1st Viscount Tyrconnel, of Belton House, and wife of Sir Richard Cust, 2nd Baronet. In 1776 he was made a Fellow of the Society of Antiquaries of London and in 1783 was made a Fellow of the Royal Society.

=== Belton House ===
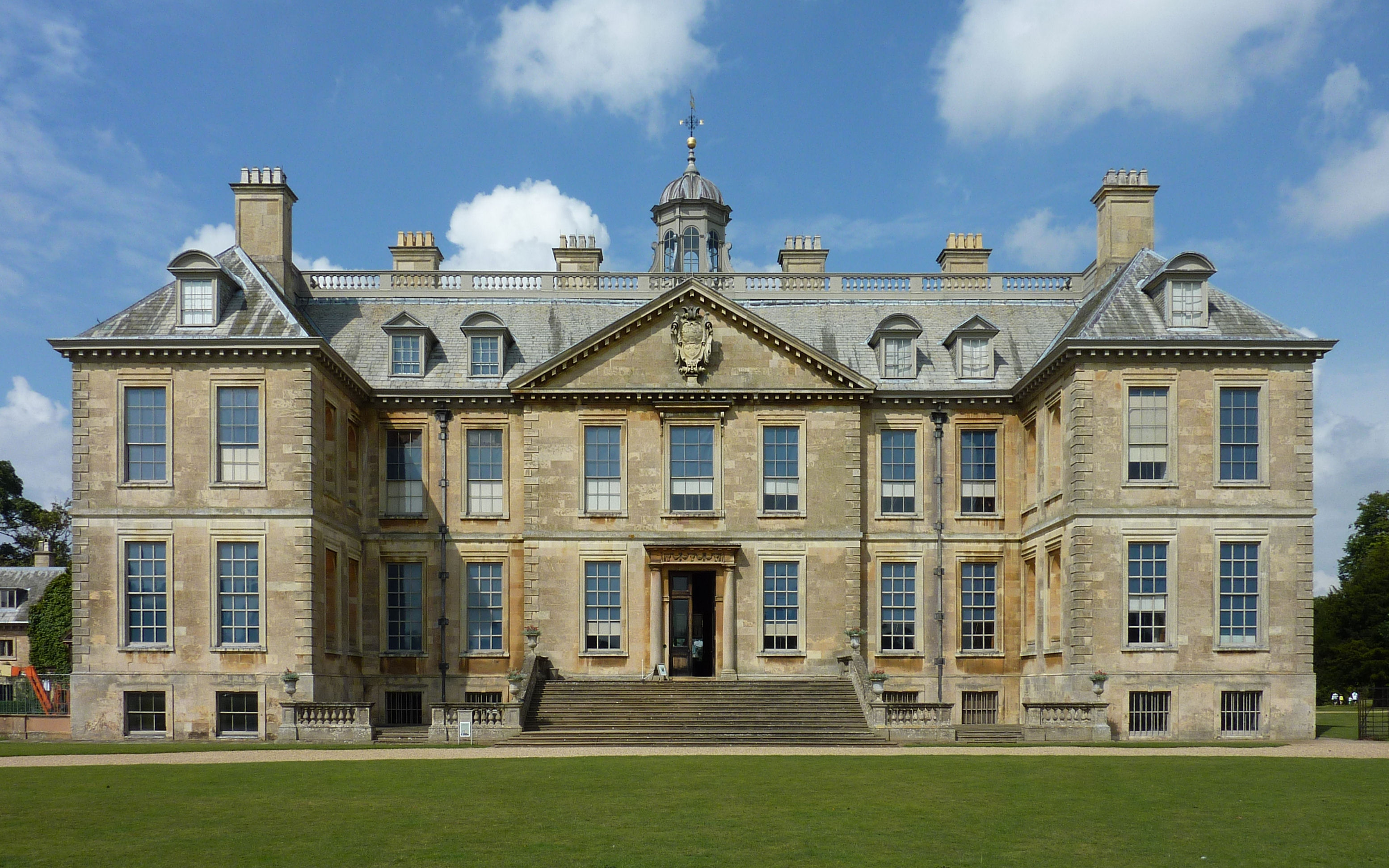
Belton House, near Grantham, Lincolnshire, inherited in 1779 by 1st Baron Brownlow

In 1779 Cust inherited Belton House, near Grantham in Lincolnshire, under the will of his paternal grandmother, Anne Brownlow (Lady Cust), wife of Sir Richard Cust, 2nd Baronet and sister, and in her issue heiress, of John Brownlow, 1st Viscount Tyrconnel (1690–1754), of Belton House.

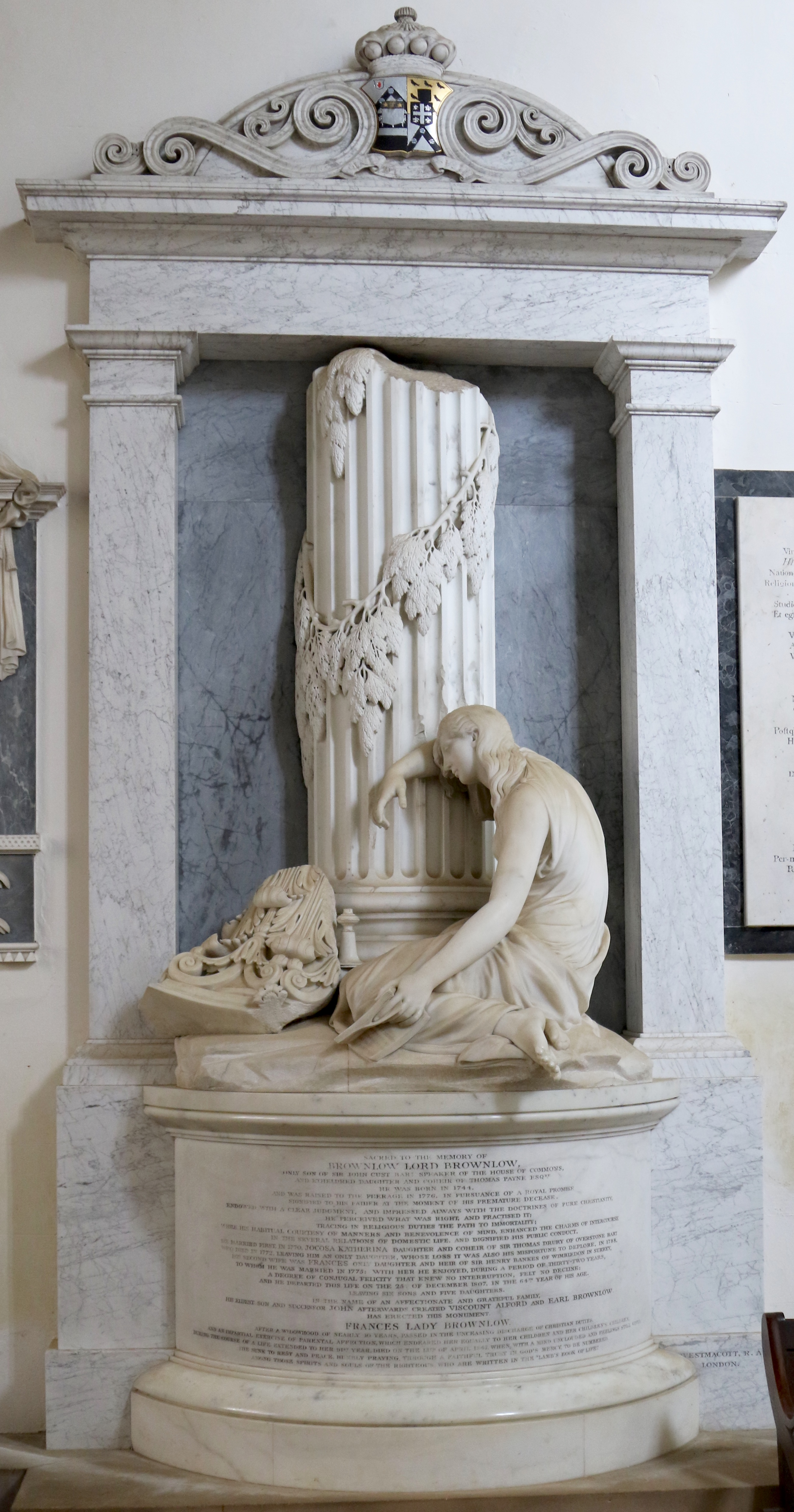
Monument to Brownlow Cust, 1st Baron Brownlow, by Richard Westmacott, in St Peter and St Paul's Church, Belton

== Marriages and progeny ==
Cust married twice:

- Firstly, in 1770, to Jocosa Katherina Drury (d. 1772), daughter and heiress of Sir Thomas Drury, 1st Baronet (1712–1759) of Overstone in Northamptonshire, by whom he had one daughter. His wife died two years after the marriage. Their daughter Elizabeth Cust catalogued the pictures at the family home of Belton in 1805–6 and produced several copies of the Old Masters in the collection, as well as original portraits of her younger siblings William, Edward, and Anne.

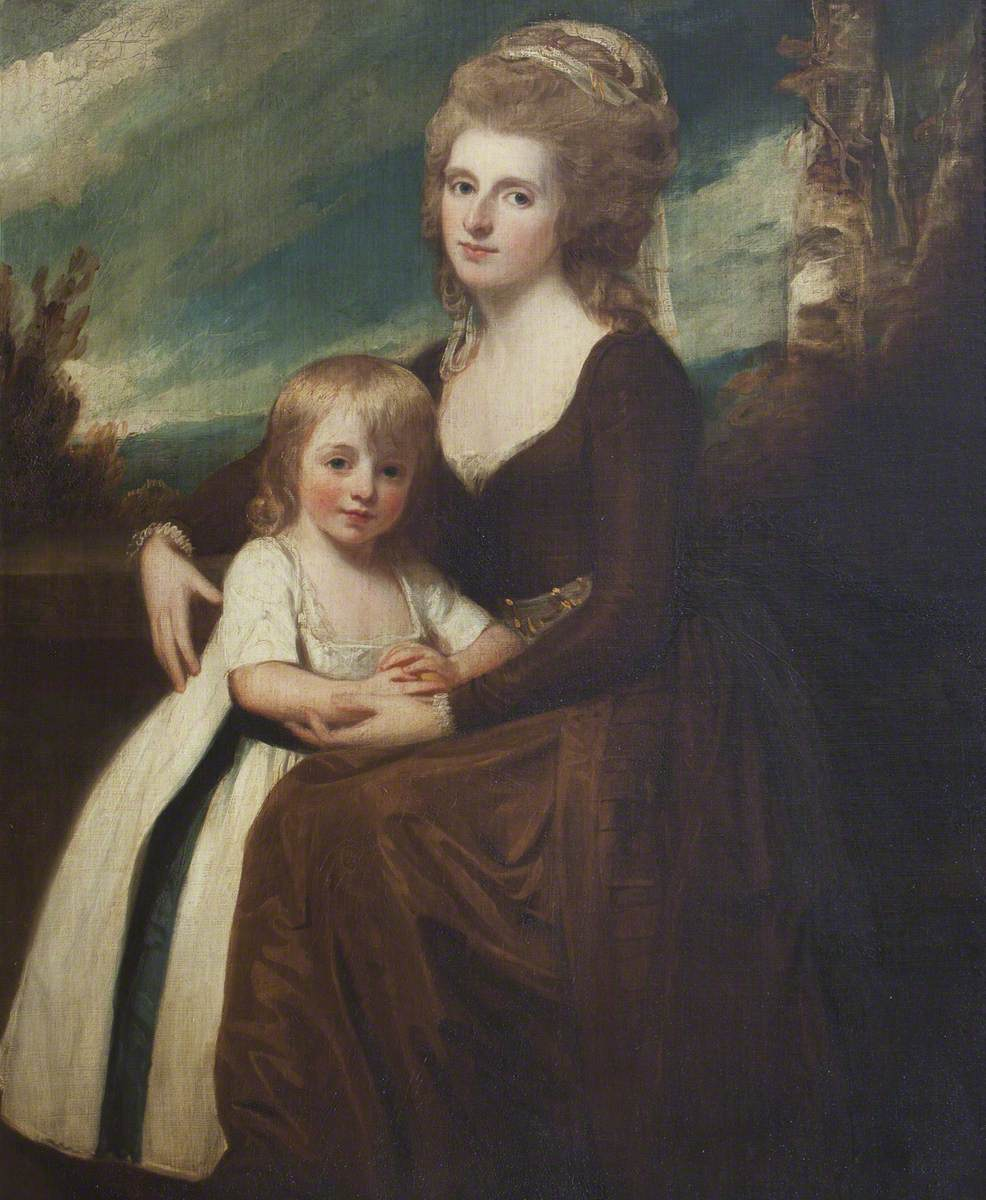
Frances, Baroness Brownlow and her eldest son John, double portrait by George Romney

- Secondly, in 1775, to Frances Bankes, daughter and heiress of Sir Henry Bankes of Wimbledon in Surrey, by whom he had five sons and one daughter:
  - John Cust, 1st Earl Brownlow, 1st Viscount Alford, 2nd Baron Brownlow, 5th Baronet (1779–1853), eldest son and heir, in 1815 created Earl Brownlow and Viscount Alford, a Member of Parliament for Lincolnshire and for Clitheroe in Lancashire;
  - Rev. Henry Cockayne Cust (1780–1861), Canon of Windsor;
  - William Cust (1787–1845), MP;
  - Peregrine Cust (1791–1873), MP;
  - Sir Edward Cust, 1st Baronet (1794–1878), a soldier and politician, who in 1876 was created a baronet "of Leasowe Castle in the County of Chester".
  - Anne Cust (1796–1867), who married Sir William Fowle Middleton, 2nd Baronet.

== Arms ==
Coat of arms of Brownlow Cust, 1st Baron Brownlow
Crest A Lion's Head erased Sable gorged with a Collar paly wavy of six Argent and Azure Escutcheon Ermine on a Chevron Sable three Fountains proper Supporters On either side a Lion reguardant Argent each gorged with a Collar paly wavy of six Argent and Azure Motto Esse Quam Videri (To be, rather than to seem)

Parliament of the United Kingdom
Preceded by –	Member of Parliament for Ilchester; 1766–1774; With: Peter Legh	Succeeded by Peregrine Cust; William Innes
Preceded by –	Member of Parliament for Grantham; 1774–1776	Succeeded by –
Baronetage of England
Preceded by John Cust	Baronet (of Stamford); 1770–1807	Succeeded by John Cust
Peerage of Great Britain
New creation	Baron Brownlow; 1776–1807	Succeeded by John Cust
