= Robert Curzon (MP, born 1774) =

British Member of Parliament

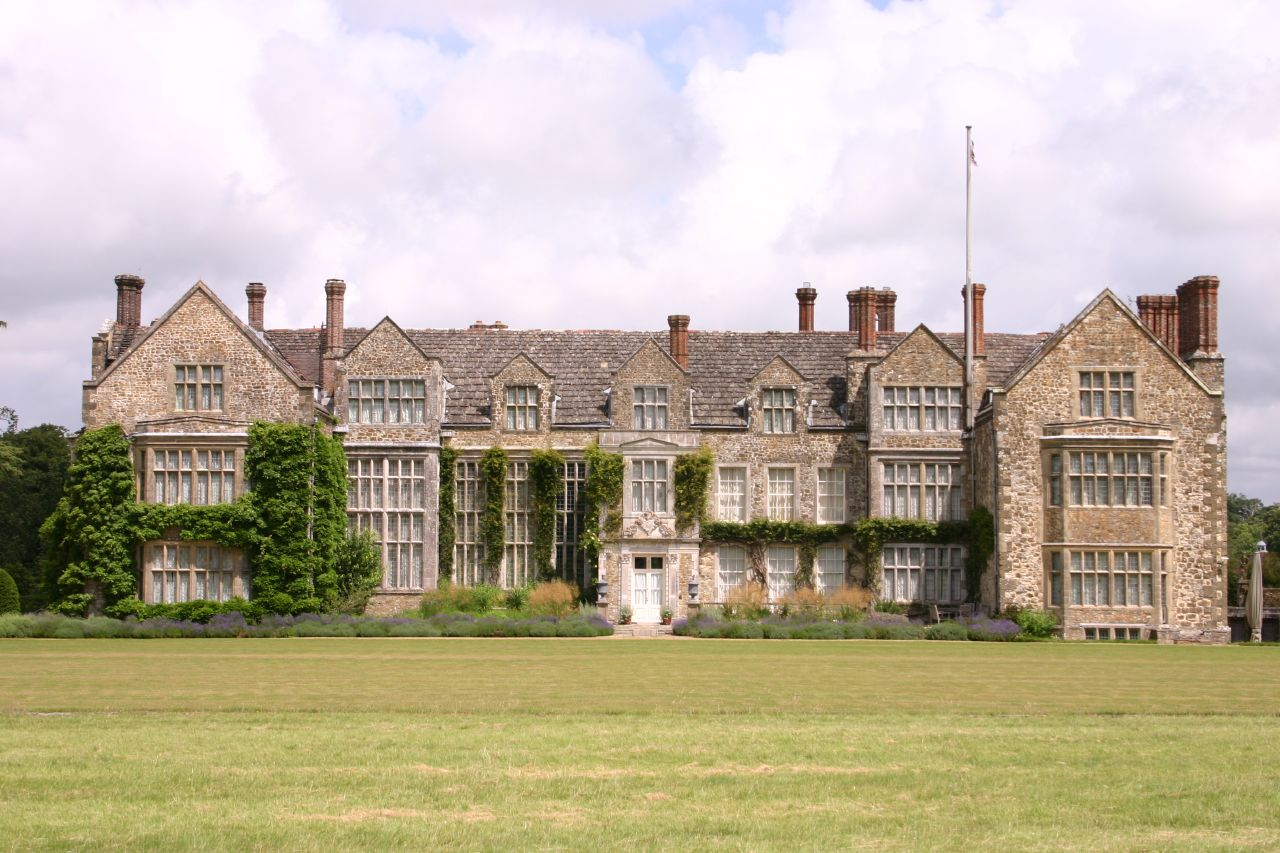
Parham Park house

The Honourable Robert Curzon (13 February 1774 – 14 May 1863), of Parham Park, Sussex, was a long-standing British Member of Parliament.

== Life ==
Curzon was the third but second surviving son of Assheton Curzon, 1st Viscount Curzon of Penn House, Buckinghamshire by his second wife Dorothy, daughter of Sir Robert Grosvenor, 6th Baronet; Penn Assheton Curzon was his elder half-brother. Richard Curzon-Howe, 1st Earl Howe was his nephew. He was educated at Westminster School and Lincoln's Inn. He matriculated in 1792 at Christ Church, Oxford, where he was awarded a B.A. in 1795.

He was elected to Parliament for Clitheroe in 1796 (succeeding his cousin Richard Erle-Drax-Grosvenor), a seat he held for the next 35 years. He was also Justice of the Peace (JP), Deputy Lieutenant of Sussex and selected High Sheriff of Sussex for 1834–35.

== Family ==
Curzon married the Hon. Harriet Anne, eldest daughter of Cecil Bisshopp, 12th Baron Zouche of Parham, in 1808. The barony of Zouche fell into abeyance on Lord Zouche's death in 1828 but was called out of abeyance the following year in favour of Harriet Anne (who became known as the Baroness de la Zouche).

Curzon inherited Hagley Hall, Staffordshire and other unentailed properties on the death of his father in 1820 and acquired Parham Park in trust on the death of his father-in-law in 1828.

Curzon died at Parham Park in May 1863, leaving 2 sons, and was buried at Parham. Lady de la Zouche died in May 1870 and was succeeded by their elder son, Robert, who had previously succeeded his father as Member of Parliament for Clitheroe in 1831. In his will Curzon directed that the Hagley estate should be sold to provide an income for his younger son, the barrister Edward Cecil Curzon.

== Legacy ==
Curzon owned a copy of the Third Folio of Shakespeare's works, containing what may be the only copy of a Portrait of Anne Hathaway, Shakespeare's wife.

Parliament of Great Britain
Preceded by Sir John Aubrey, Bt; Richard Erle-Drax-Grosvenor	Member of Parliament for Clitheroe; 1796–1800; With: Lord Edward Bentinck	Succeeded by Parliament of the United Kingdom
Parliament of the United Kingdom
Preceded by Parliament of Great Britain	Member of Parliament for Clitheroe; 1801–1831; With: Lord Edward Bentinck 1801–1802; Hon. John Cust 1802–1808; James Gordon 1808–1812; Viscount Castlereagh 1812 (never sat); Edward Wilbraham-Bootle 1812–1818; Hon. William Cust 1818–1822; Henry Porcher 1822–1826; Hon. Peregrine Cust 1826–1831	Succeeded by Hon. Peregrine Cust; Hon. Robert Curzon
