= Minuscule 911 =

12th-century Greek New Testament manuscript

- New Testament manuscript
- Text: New Testament (except the Gospels)
- Date: 12th century
- Script: Greek
- Now at: British Library
- Size: 26.5 cm by 21.5 cm
- Type: Byzantine text-type
- Category: V

Minuscule 911 (in the Gregory-Aland numbering), O^{29} (von Soden), is a 12th-century Greek minuscule manuscript of the New Testament with a commentary on parchment.

== Description ==
The codex contains the text of the Book of Acts, Pauline epistles, Catholic epistles, and Book of Revelation, on 334 parchment leaves (size 26.5 cm by 21.5 cm). It has lacuna in 1 John-Jude.

It contains a commentary, which is written in catena.

The texts of Acts 14:2-17:22; 2 Cor 5:13-6:6; 8:22-9:6; Col 1:1-6 were supplied by a later hand in the 15th century.

It contains Prolegomena, subscriptions at the end of each book with numbers of στιχοι.

== Text ==
The Greek text of the codex is a representative of the Byzantine text-type. Kurt Aland made a textual profile for it (Acts 73^{1} 29^{1/2} 2^{2} 1^{s}; Cath 45^{1} 5^{1/2} 1^{2} 1^{s}; Paul 196^{1} 48^{1/2} 3^{2} 0^{s}). On the basis of this profile Aland placed it in Category V.

== History ==
According to Scrivener the manuscript was written in the 11th century, according to C. R. Gregory it was written in the 12th century. Currently the manuscript is dated by the INTF to the 12th century.

Formerly it was held in the Karakalou monastery at Athos peninsula. It was bought by Robert Curzon in 1837. C. R. Gregory saw it in 1883.

The manuscript was added to the list of New Testament manuscripts by Scrivener (217^{a}, 235^{p}) and Gregory (227^{a}, 282^{p}). In 1908 Gregory gave the number 911 to it.

The part of the manuscript with the text of the Apocalypse was described and its text was collated by Scrivener. Herman C. Hoskier collated its text again.

Formerly minuscule 2040 was classified as a separate manuscript. Currently it is included in Minuscule 911.

It is currently housed in the British Library in London (in two of the Additional Manuscripts). 318 folios with the text of the Acts and the Epistles are housed at Add MS 39599; 16 folios with the text of the Apocalypse are at Add MS 39601.

== See also ==
- List of New Testament minuscules
- Minuscule 910
- Biblical manuscript
- Textual criticism
