= Le Gendre Starkie =

Le Gendre Starkie may refer to:

- Le Gendre Starkie (1799–1865), MP for Pontefract 1826–1830
- Le Gendre Starkie (1828–1899), MP for Clitheroe 1853–1857
