= Warrington Cavaillé-Coll Organ =

Historic pipe organ in Warrington, UK

The Warrington Cavaillé-Coll Organ is housed in Parr Hall in Warrington (UK). It is one of the few surviving pipe organs in the UK that were built by the French organ builder Aristide Cavaillé-Coll (1811–99).

== History ==
=== Bracewell Hall ===
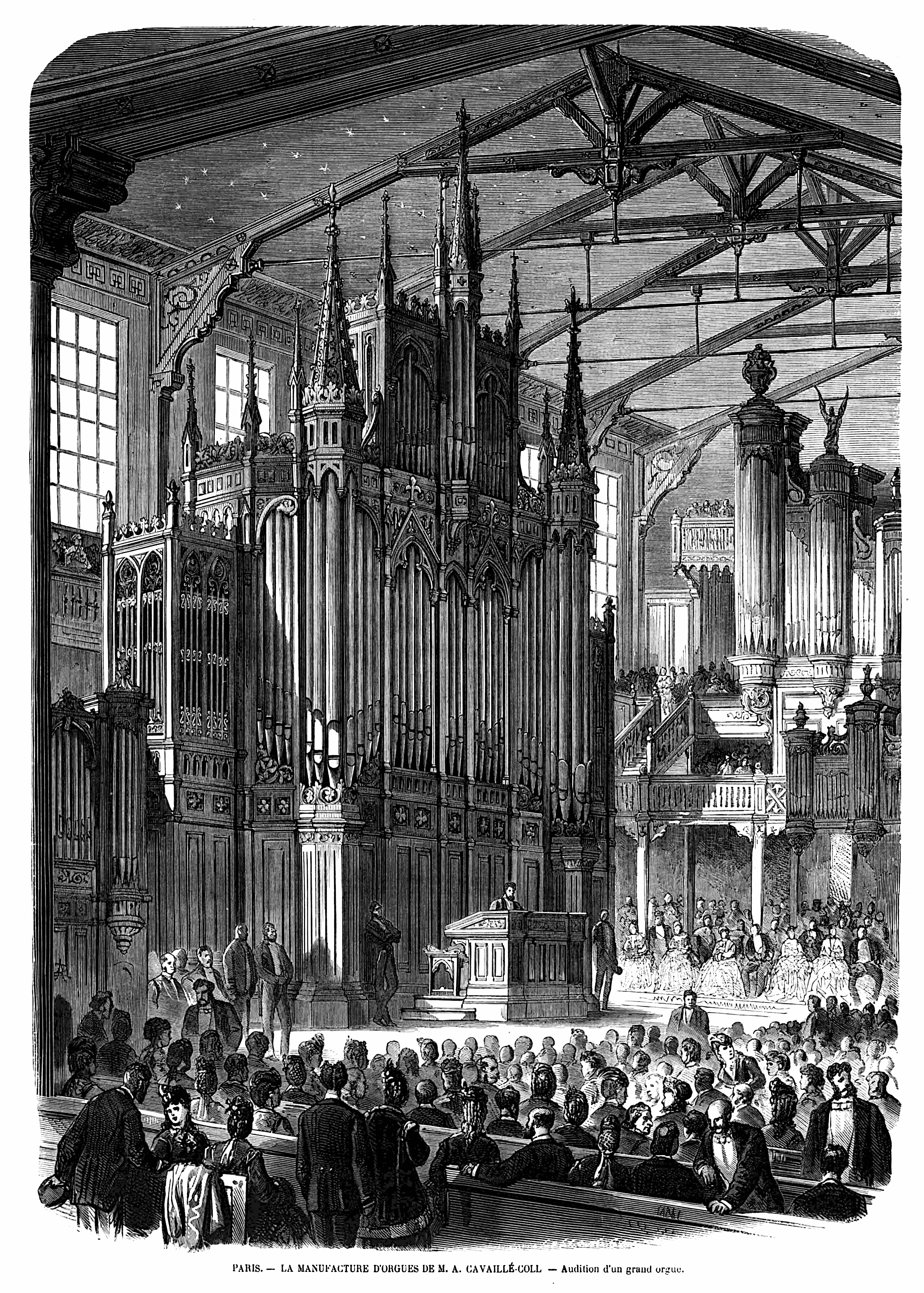
The organ (in 1870) displayed in the demonstration hall of Aristide Cavaillé-Coll in Paris prior to its delivery to Bracewell Hall.

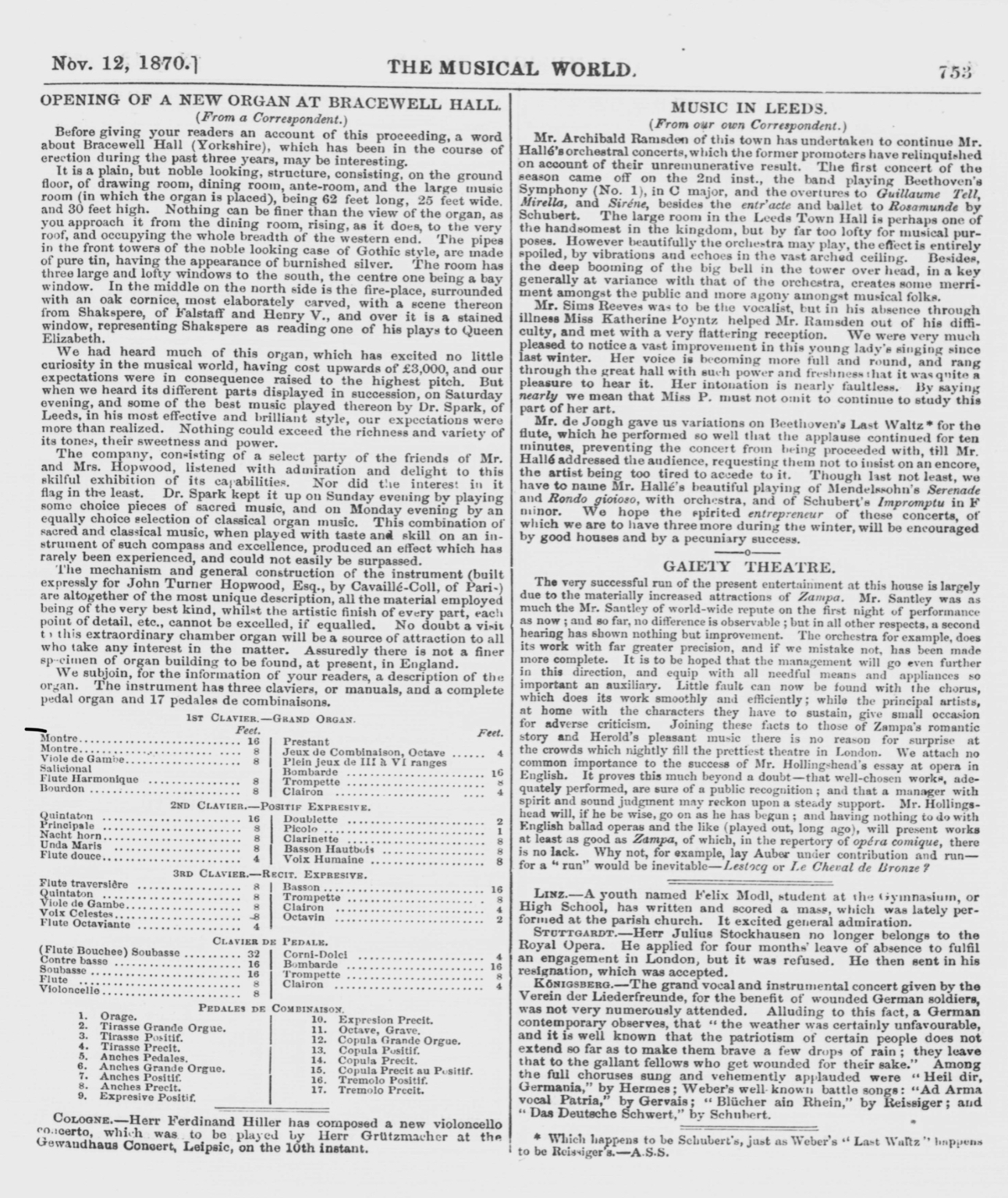
The Musical World’s 1870 report of the new organ.

The pipe organ was built in 1870 for John Turner Hopwood, a lawyer and Liberal MP for Clitheroe, and was installed in his house at Bracewell Hall, Barnoldswick, Lancashire (demolished 1950). According to reports in The Musical World the completion of the organ - which cost more than £3,000 - was commemorated with three days of organ recitals by Dr William Spark the civic organist of Leeds.

The large music room (in which the organ is placed) [... is] 63 feet long, 25 feet wide and 30 feet high. Nothing can be finer than the view of the organ as you approach it from the dining room, rising, as it does, to the very roof, and occupying the whole breadth of the western end. The pipes in the front towers of the noble looking case of Gothic style, are made of pure tin, having the appearance of burnished silver.

=== Ketton Hall ===
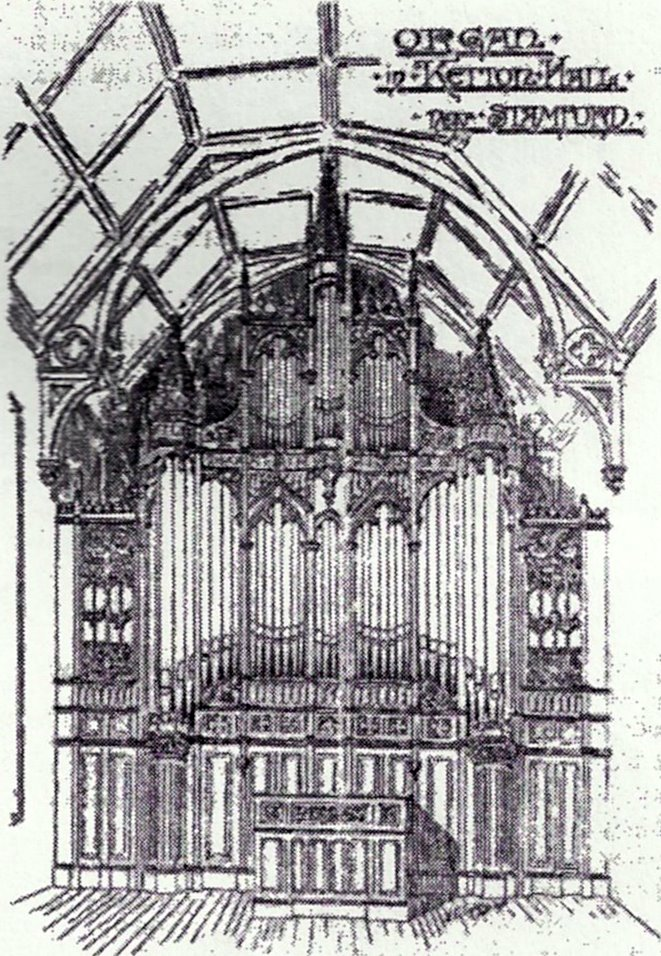
The organ in Ketton Hall near Stamford; The Musical Standard, 1 April 1893.

In about 1883 the organ was then moved by Turner Hopwood to Ketton Hall, Rutland (demolished 1920s).

=== Warrington ===
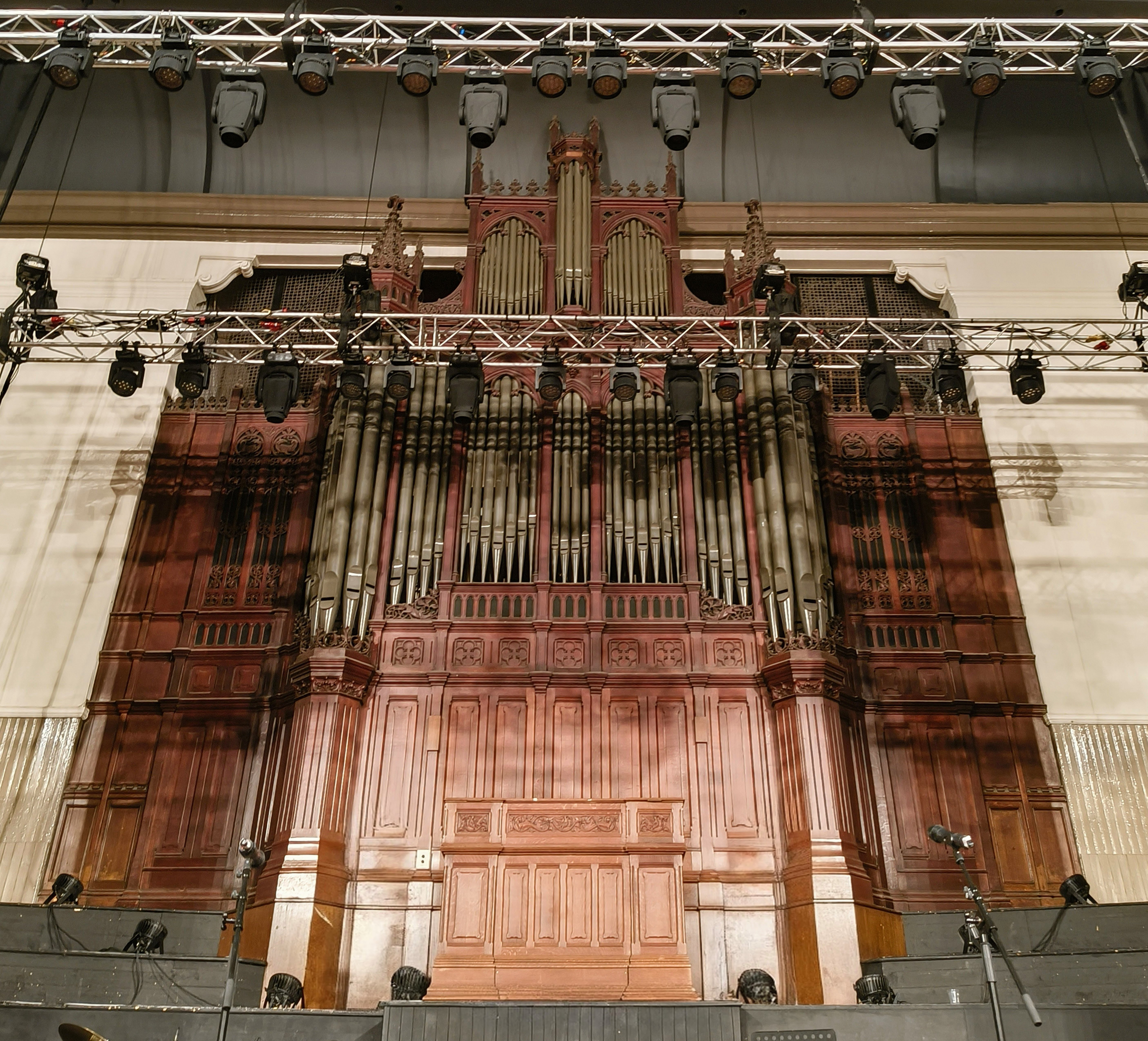
The organ's current residence at the back of the Parr Hall's stage, as of December 2025.

The organ was bought by Warrington Corporation and installed in the Parr Hall in 1926, still with its original specification.

In 1969 the Warrington Corporation decided that a £9,000 restoration of the instrument was not a viable proposition. But following a publicity drive by local people who formed the Cavaillé-Coll Organ Retention Committee the Corporation agreed to retain the organ if the money could be raised. The Corporation generously added to the sum raised by the Committee to ensure that essential maintenance work went ahead. On completion of the work a celebratory concert took place, on 23 November 1972, featuring the organists Gilbert Kennedy and Nicolas Kynaston, with massed Warrington choirs.

In late 2006 Warrington Borough Council decided that the modern needs of the venue and its continued viability meant that a new home would be sought for the organ. Sheffield Cathedral was a potential new home for the organ, but by September 2011 it was clear that the Cathedral authorities would be unable to raise the substantial sum needed to move and restore the organ. Subsequent discussions have taken place to consider the instrument's move from the Parr Hall to St. Mary's Church, Warrington.

In 2015 the significance of the instrument was recognized by the award of a Grade 1 Historic Organ certificate by the British Institute of Organ Studies, the UK's amenity society for the pipe organ. In 2017 the future of this instrument remains uncertain.

== Recordings ==
Several CD recordings of the organ in the Parr Hall have been made.

- Roger Fisher (1984/2011). Roger Fisher plays the Cavaillé-Coll Organ in The Parr Hall, Warrington.
- Murray Stewart (1995) Louis Vierne: ‘Symphony No 1’ & ‘24 pièces en style libre’ (extracts).
- Roger Fisher (1996). Roger Fisher plays the Cavaillé-Coll Organ in the Parr Hall, Warrington].
- Aldert Winkelman (2004). César Franck ‘L`organiste’ (Volume 1).
