= Sir Ralph Assheton, 2nd Baronet, of Lever =

English politician

Sir Ralph Assheton, 2nd Baronet, of Lever (ca. 1605 – 30 January 1680) was an English politician who sat in the House of Commons at various times between 1625 and 1680.

Assheton was the son of Sir Ralph Assheton, 1st Baronet of Lever, Lancashire and his wife Dorothy Bellingham, daughter of Sir James Bellingham of Levens, Westmorland. He matriculated from Magdalene College, Cambridge at Easter 1623. He was admitted at Gray's Inn on 7 May 1624. He was elected Member of Parliament for Clitheroe in 1625 and was re-elected in 1626.

He was appointed Sheriff of Lancashire for 1633. In April 1640, Assheton was elected MP for Clitheroe in the Short Parliament. He was re-elected in November 1640 as MP for Clitheroe in the Long Parliament. He succeeded his father to the Assheton baronetcy on 18 October 1644 and to the family's Downham estate near Clitheroe. (Great Lever, the family's original home, had been sold by his father in 1629.)

In 1660 Assheton was re-elected MP for Clitheroe for the Convention Parliament and again in 1661 for the Cavalier Parliament but was unseated on petition in February 1662. He was re-elected MP for Clitheroe in 1679 a year before his death.

He built the vault beneath the Assheton chapel at St Leonard's Church, Downham and endowed a sermon on the resurrection to be preached an annually on the anniversary of his death. He married twice; firstly Lady Dorothy Tufton, the daughter of Nicholas Tufton, 1st Earl of Thanet and secondly Elizabeth, the daughter of Sir Sapcotes Harrington of Rand, Lincolnshire with whom he had one son, who died before him.

Assheton died at the age of 75. He was succeeded by his brother Edmund.

Parliament of England
| Preceded by William Fanshawe; Ralph Whitfield | Member of Parliament for Clitheroe; 1625–1626; With: William Fanshawe 1625; George Kirke 1626; Christopher Hatton 1626 | Succeeded by Thomas Jermyn; William Newell |
| Vacant Parliament suspended since 1629 | Member of Parliament for Clitheroe; 1640–1653; With: Richard Shuttleworth | Not represented in Barebones Parliament |
| Preceded by Not represented | Member of Parliament for Clitheroe; 1659–1662; With: William White 1660; William Hulton 1660; John Heath 1660–1662 | Succeeded by John Heath; Ambrose Pudsay |
| Preceded by John Heath; Sir Thomas Stringer | Member of Parliament for Clitheroe; 1679–1680; With: Sir Thomas Stringer | Succeeded by Sir Thomas Stringer; Henry Marsden |
Baronetage of England
| Preceded by Ralph Assheton | Baronet (of Lever); 1644–1680 | Succeeded by Edmund Assheton |
