= Christopher Wilkinson (MP) =

17th-century English landowner and politician

Member of Parliament for Clitheroe
- In office 1689–1689

Personal details
- Born: c. 1637
- Died: 13 January 1694
- Spouse(s): Ellen Cheyne (m. 1663) Barbara Hampham (m. 1669) Ellen Waddington (m. 1674)
- Children: 1
- Education: St Catharine's College, Cambridge; Lincoln’s Inn

Christopher Wilkinson (c. 1637 - 1694), of Lincoln's Inn and Waddow Hall, Waddington, Yorkshire was an English landowner and politician. He represented Clitheroe in the House of Commons in 1689.

== Early life and education ==
Wilkinson was born circa 1637, the third son of Thomas Wilkinson and Elizabeth Clement. He started his education at St Catharine's College, Cambridge in 1655, then at Lincoln’s Inn in 1661.

== Personal life ==
Wilkinson married three times. He married his first wife, Ellen Cheyne, on 16 December 1663; the couple had one child. On 27 April 1669, he married Barbara (née Barker) Harpham, a widow, by license. He then married Ellen (née Dawson) Waddington, also a widow, on 8 January 1674. He had no children from his second and third marriages.

He died on 13 January 1694. By that time, he had disinherited his only son due to the son's Catholic beliefs.
