= Richard Shuttleworth (MP for Clitheroe) =

English politician

Richard Shuttleworth (c.1613 – 1648) was an English politician who sat in the House of Commons between 1640 and 1648. He fought in the Parliamentarian army in the English Civil War.

Shuttleworth was the son of Colonel Richard Shuttleworth (1607–1689) of Gawthorpe and his wife Fleetwood Barton, daughter of Richard Barton of Barton-in-Amoundeness. His father was MP for Preston and High Sheriff of Lancashire.

In April 1640, Shuttleworth was elected Member of Parliament for Clitheroe in the Short Parliament. He was re-elected in November 1640 for the Long Parliament and sat until his death in 1648.

Shuttleworth married Jane Kirk of London and had two sons (Sir Richard (1646–1682) and Nicholas) and a daughter (Fleetwood).

Parliament of England
Vacant Parliament suspended since 1629	Member of Parliament for Clitheroe; 1640–1648; With: Sir Ralph Assheton	Succeeded by Sir Ralph Assheton
