= Mathew Wilson =

English landowner and politician

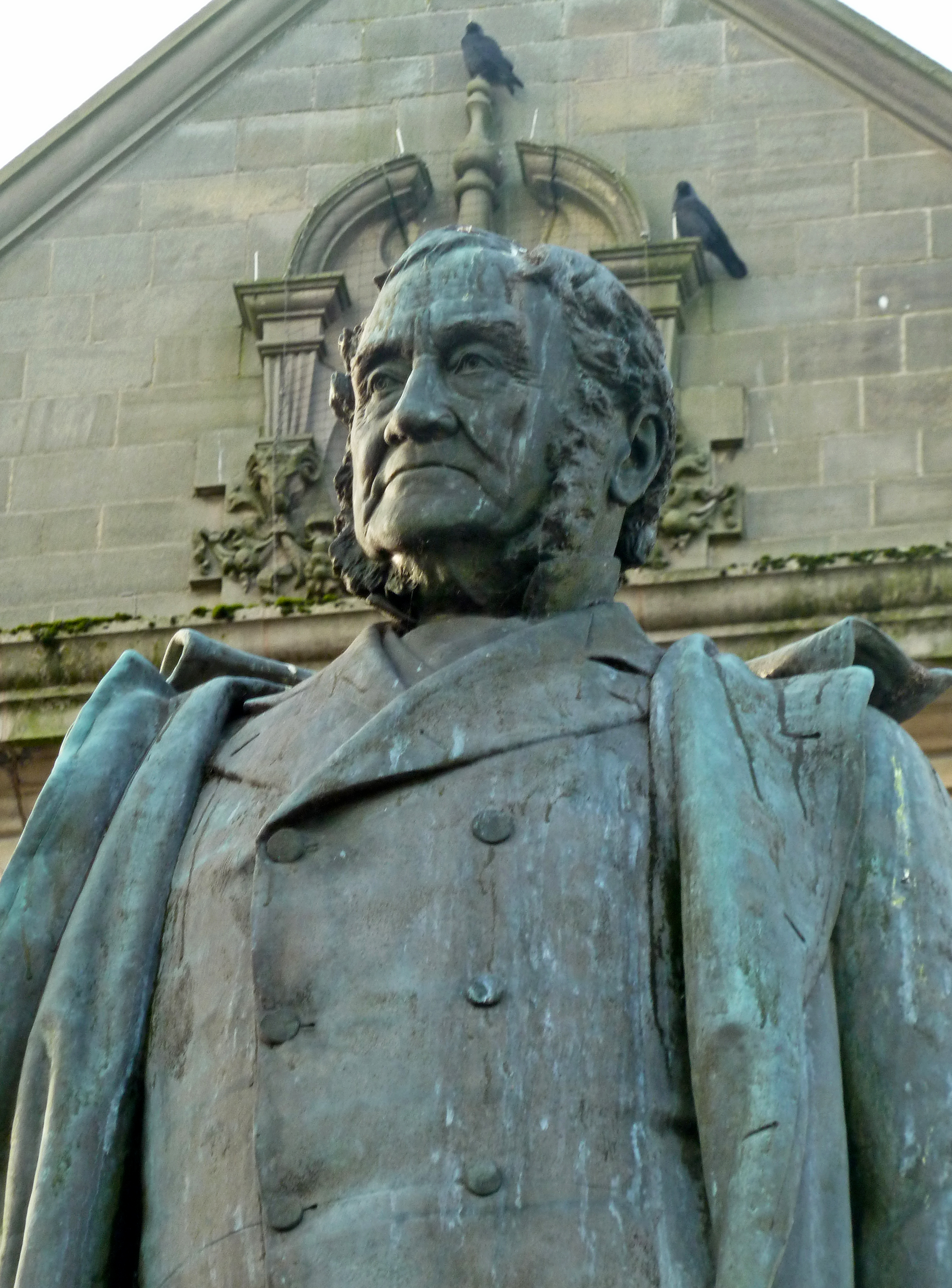
Sir Mathew Wilson by Albert Bruce-Joy, Skipton

Sir Mathew Wilson, 1st Baronet DL (29 August 1802 – 18 January 1891) was an English landowner and Liberal politician who sat in the House of Commons at various times between 1842 and 1886.

Wilson was the son of Mathew Wilson, a solicitor of Eshton Hall and his wife Mary Clive Wilson. His father and mother were first cousins. He was educated at Harrow School and Brasenose College, Oxford. He became a J.P. at the age of 22, and became the longest serving magistrate in Skipton's history at the time of his death aged 88.

Wilson was elected in 1841 as Member of Parliament for Clitheroe but was unseated in 1842. He stood again in 1847 and regained Clitheroe, but after the 1852 election was unseated again in 1853. Notwithstanding incidents of electoral malpractice, he was created a baronet on 28 February 1874 and later that year was elected as MP for West Riding of Yorkshire North. He held the seat until it was split up under the Redistribution of Seats Act 1885. In the 1885 general election, he was then elected for Skipton which he held until his defeat in 1886. He also became Deputy Lieutenant and Chairman of the Board of Guardians.

He married, June Louisa Emerson Amcotts, only daughter of Sir Wharton Emerson Amcotts, Bart, of Kettlethorpe Park, Lincolnshire, on 15 June 1826. They had a son Mathew (1827–1909) who succeeded to the baronetcy. She died in 1833 and many years later Wilson married Frances Pedler. His son Mathew married Gratiana Mary Thomas, daughter of Admiral Richard Darton Thomas (1777–1857).

Wilson died at Brighton aged 88.

Parliament of the United Kingdom
Preceded by John Fort	Member of Parliament for Clitheroe; 1841–1842	Succeeded by Edward Cardwell
Preceded by Edward Cardwell	Member of Parliament for Clitheroe; 1847–1853	Succeeded by John Aspinall
Preceded by Francis Sharp Powell; Lord Frederick Cavendish	Member of Parliament for Northern West Riding of Yorkshire; 1874–1885; With: Lord Frederick Cavendish 1874–1882; Isaac Holden 1882–1885	Constituency abolished
New constituency	Member of Parliament for Skipton; 1885–1886	Succeeded by Walter Morrison
Baronetage of the United Kingdom
New creation	Baronet (of Eshton Hall); 1874–1891	Succeeded by Matthew Wilson
