= Hagley Hall, Rugeley =

Coordinates: 52.75975°N 1.94235°W

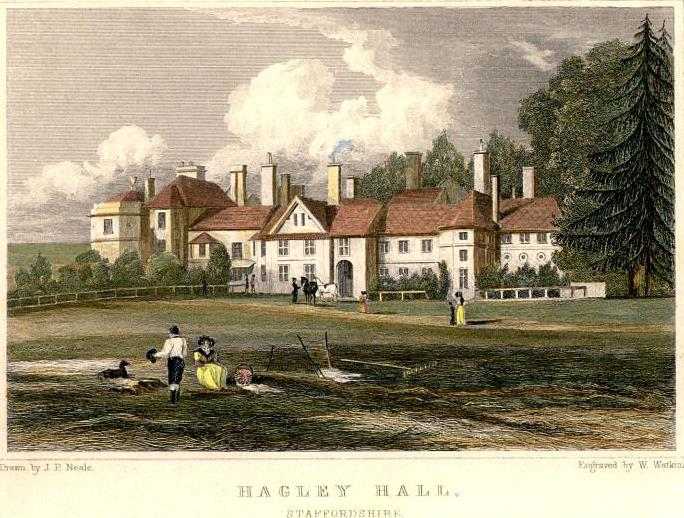
An 1822 engraving of Hagley Hall from the estate side by John Preston Neale

Hagley Hall was formerly a country house on the outskirts of Rugeley, Staffordshire. After it came into the ownership of the Curzon family, the estate became known as Hagley Park and appeared under that name in 19th century gazetteers, where it was described as "a fine old house and grounds". The site was progressively demolished during the 20th century.

== A fine old house ==
In about 1392, Thomas de Thomenhorn, keeper of the royal forest of Cannock Chase, built a moated manor that probably stood on the island in the middle of what is now Elmore Park, Rugeley. A new Hagley Hall was built by Sir Richard Weston in 1636 and this was extended and remodelled when the property came into the hands of Sir Assheton Curzon in 1752. In particular an octagonal drawing room designed by James Wyatt was added to one end of the structure. Landscaping of the grounds included building an ornamental bridge over the Rising Brook, an affluent of the River Trent, and also making weirs along it course. There was also a folly under the house in the form of several interconnecting, elaborately columned chambers leading to a basilica cut into the sandstone.

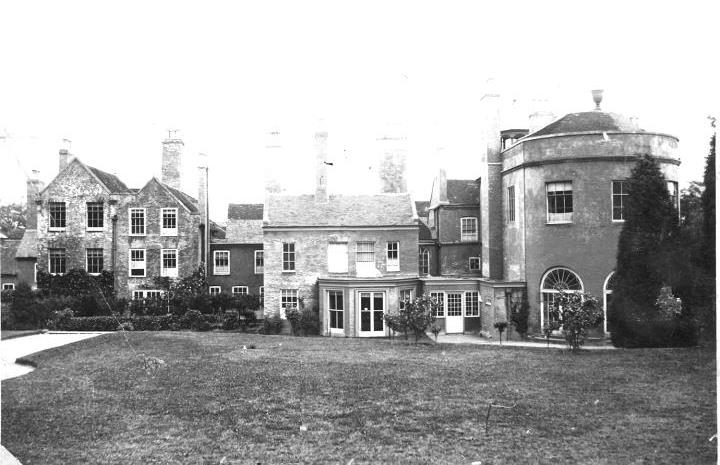
Hagley Hall from the garden side in 1901, with the octagonal drawing room on the right

Also living at Hagley Park was the Viscount’s son, the Honourable Robert Curzon. After he assumed the captaincy of the local volunteer regiment in 1804, the Hall served as their offices, while parades were held in the grounds. After 1864 Hagley Park passed to a succession of new owners and during World War I was a centre for the Officers' Training Corps. After that it was sold to the South Staffordshire Waterworks Company in 1919, who eventually demolished most of the house. The portion left was acquired by Rugeley Council in 1967 for use as an arts centre until the site was developed for housing in the 1980s.

The site of the hall is now called Bank Top (WS15 2GD) and the lake once in its grounds is nearby. The name of the estate was preserved in what was originally called Hagley Park County Secondary Modern in 1956, which in 2011 became Hagley Park Academy.
