= Ralph Assheton (1830–1907) =

British politician (1830–1907)

Ralph Assheton (1830–1907) was an English politician.

== Biography ==
=== Early life ===
Ralph Assheton was born on 20 December 1830. His father was William Assheton (1788–1853) and his mother, Hon. Frances Annabella Cokayne (1795–1835). His maternal great-grandfather was Charles Cokayne, 5th Viscount Cullen (1710–1802). He graduated from Trinity College, Cambridge, where he received a Masters of Arts degree.

=== Career ===
He was elected as Member of Parliament for Clitheroe at an unopposed by-election in 1868 following the death of Richard Fort. He held the seat at the subsequent 1868 general election, and also in 1874, but was defeated at the 1880 general election. He did not stand for Parliament again.

=== Personal life ===
He married Emily Augusta Feilden, sister of Joseph Feilden (1824–1895) and daughter of Joseph Feilden and Frances Mary Master, on 3 August 1854. They had seven children:

- Frances Annabella Assheton (died 1939).
- Dorothy Assheton (died 1908).
- Joan Assheton (died 1962).
- Sir Ralph Cockayne Assheton, 1st Bt (1860–1945).
- Richard Assheton (1863–1915).
- Reverend William Orme Assheton (1866–1953).
- Nicholas Radclyffe Assheton (1870–1960).

They resided at Downham Hall in Downham, Lancashire. He died on 22 June 1907.

Parliament of the United Kingdom
Preceded by Richard Fort I	Member of Parliament for Clitheroe; 1868–1880	Succeeded by Richard Fort II
