= Francis Pearson =

British politician

Sir Francis Pearson Bt
- Sir Francis Fenwick Pearson, 1st Bt in 1969

Member of Parliament for Clitheroe
- In office 1959–1970
- Preceded by: Richard Fort
- Succeeded by: David Walder

Parliamentary Private Secretary to the Prime Minister
- In office 1963–1964
- Prime Minister: Alec Douglas-Home
- Preceded by: Knox Cunningham
- Succeeded by: Ernest Fernyhough

Personal details
- Born: Francis Fenwick Pearson; 13 June 1911
- Died: 17 February 1991 (aged 79)
- Party: Conservative
- Education: Uppingham School, Rutland
- Alma mater: Trinity Hall, Cambridge
- Occupation: British colonial administrator Chief Minister of Manipur State; Farmer

Military service
- Allegiance: United Kingdom
- Branch/service: British Indian Army
- Unit: 1st King George's Own Gurkha Rifles

Sir Francis Fenwick Pearson, 1st Baronet, MBE, JP, DL (13 June 1911 – 17 February 1991) was a British colonial administrator, farmer and politician.

== Colonial service ==
Pearson attended Uppingham School in Rutland, and then Trinity Hall, Cambridge. He was commissioned a Second Lieutenant onto the Unattached List for the Indian Army from being a Second Lieutenant, T.A. (University Candidate) in September 1932, with seniority from 29 January 1931. After a year attached to a British regiment in India, he was appointed to the Indian Army and posted to the 1st King George's Own Gurkha Rifles on 3 November 1933. He served as Aide-de-camp to the Viceroy of India from June 1935 to April 1936.

=== Indian Political Service ===
Pearson transferred to the Indian Political Service in October 1935. In June 1945 he was appointed a Member of the Order of the British Empire as captain, Indian Political Service.

He served as the President of the Manipur State Durbar (later designated as the Chief Minister) in the princely state of Manipur from 1945 to 1947. The ruler of Manipur at that time was Maharaja Bodhachandra Singh. Pearson headed the committee that formulated the Manipur State Constitution Act, passed in May 1947. He handed over power to Maharajkumar Priyobrata Singh, the Maharaja's nominee for chief minister, on 14 August 1947.

The village of Pearson in Churachandpur district was named in his honour.

== Parliamentary career ==
Pearson returned to Britain after Indian independence and settled in Lancashire where he became a farmer, and also involved himself in local government. He was a Justice of the Peace for Lancashire from 1952.

At the 1959 general election, Pearson replaced Richard Fort (who had died earlier in the year) as Conservative Party Member of Parliament for Clitheroe, a rural constituency in the Lancashire foothills of the Pennines. He was swiftly named as an Assistant Government Whip (1960) and became a Lord Commissioner of the Treasury (Government Whip) in March 1962.

== Parliamentary Private Secretary ==
Sir Alec Douglas-Home, who became Prime Minister in October 1963, choose Pearson to be his Parliamentary Private Secretary, an unpaid but pivotal role where Pearson had to maintain relations between the Prime Minister and his own backbenchers. When Douglas-Home lost the 1964 general election and resigned as Prime Minister, he gave Pearson a Baronetcy in his resignation honours list.

== Lancashire contribution ==
Pearson retired from Parliament at the 1970 general election, but not from politics. He was Chairman of the Central Lancashire New Town Development Corporation from 1971 (the new town covered Preston, Chorley, Leyland and several other areas).

Parliament of the United Kingdom
Preceded by Richard Fort	Member of Parliament for Clitheroe; 1959–1970	Succeeded by David Walder
Government offices
Preceded by Knox Cunningham	Parliamentary Private Secretary to the Prime Minister; 1963–1964	Succeeded by Ernest Fernyhough
Baronetage of the United Kingdom
New creation	Baronet (of Gressingham); 1963–1991	Succeeded by Francis Pearson
