= John Fort (MP) =

British industrialist and Whig politician

John Fort (died 1842) was a British industrialist and Whig politician who sat in the House of Commons from 1832 to 1841.

He was a wealthy partner in a Manchester calico textile printing firm (Fort Brothers) which had factories in Manchester and Oakenshaw, Lancashire. He was elected at the 1832 general election as the member of parliament (MP) for the borough of Clitheroe in Lancashire, and held that position until he stood down from Parliament at the 1841 general election.

His son Richard, who was High Sheriff of Lancashire in 1854, was MP for Clitheroe from 1865 to 1868.

Parliament of the United Kingdom
Preceded by Peregrine Cust; Robert Curzon	Member of Parliament for Clitheroe; 1832 – 1841	Succeeded by Mathew Wilson
