= William Brass, 1st Baron Chattisham =

British Conservative Party politician (1886–1945)

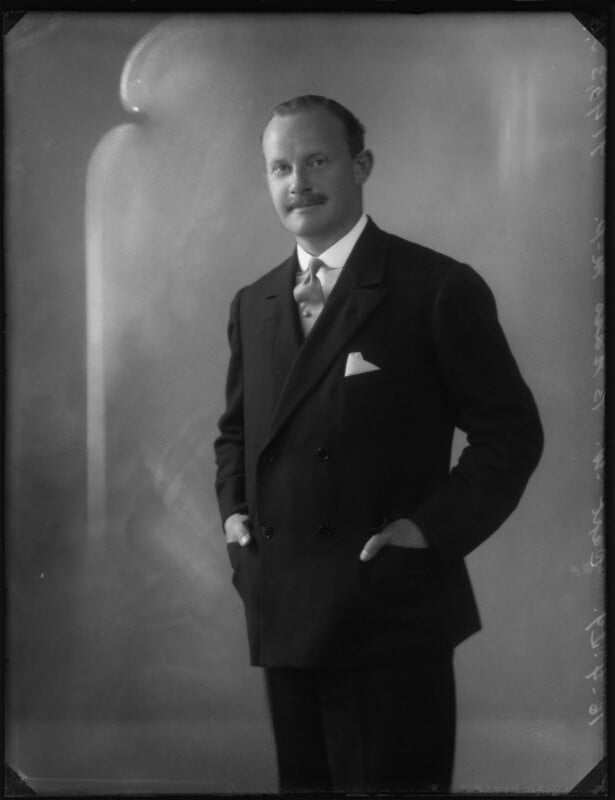
Brass in 1929

William Brass, 1st Baron Chattisham (11 February 1886 – 24 August 1945), known as Sir William Brass between 1929 and 1945, was a British Conservative Party politician.

== Early life ==
Brass was a sportsman and a soldier before entering politics, and served with the Royal Flying Corps and Royal Air Force in the First World War.

== Political career ==
He was elected to the House of Commons as the Member of Parliament (MP) for Clitheroe in 1922, a seat he retained until 1945, and held posts at the Ministry of Transport and Ministry of Aircraft Production in 1941. He served as Parliamentary Private Secretary to the Postmaster General, the Minister of Health, and the Chancellor of the Exchequer.

He was appointed to the Board of Governors of the British Film Institute in 1936 and went on to serve as its Chair from 1939 to 1945. Brass was knighted in 1929 and in 1945 he was raised to the peerage as Baron Chattisham, of Clitheroe in the County Palatine of Lancaster.

== Personal life ==
Lord Chattisham died at 20 Devonshire Place, Marylebone, on 24 August 1945, aged 59. Although cremated at Golders Green his ashes were interred at West Norwood Cemetery. He never married and the barony became extinct on his death.

== Notes ==
Parliament of the United Kingdom
Preceded by Alfred Davies	Member of Parliament for Clitheroe; 1922–1945	Succeeded by Harry Enos Randall
Peerage of the United Kingdom
New creation	Baron Chattisham; 1945	Extinct
