= Alexander Fisher (MP) =

16th-century English politician

Alexander Fisher (fl. 1584), of Gray's Inn, London, was an English politician.

He was a member (MP) of the parliament of England for Clitheroe in 1584.
