= John Aspinall (politician) =

British politician

John Thomas Walshman Aspinall (c. 1815 – 12 November 1865) was an English Conservative Party politician who sat in the House of Commons for two months in 1853.

At the 1852 general election, Aspinall stood unsuccessfully for the borough of Clitheroe in Lancashire. However, that result was declared void on 28 February 1853 after an election petition, and on 28 May 1853 Aspinall won the resulting by-election by a margin of 215 votes to 208. The by-election result was immediately denounced by the agent of the Liberal Party candidate, on the grounds that Aspinall was ineligible due to bribery in the previous contest, and bribery had taken place again. A petition was lodged, and after the committee found that bribery had taken place on Aspinall's behalf, his election was voided on 1 August 1853. He did not stand for Parliament again.

Parliament of the United Kingdom
Preceded by Mathew Wilson	Member of Parliament for Clitheroe; May 1853 – August 1853	Succeeded by Le Gendre Starkie
