= John Turner Hopwood =

English Liberal politician and barrister

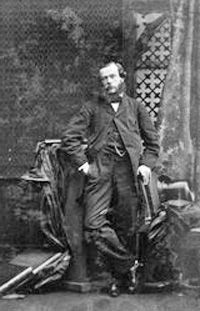
Hopwood when a Member of Parliament

John Turner Hopwood (1829 – 1 January 1900) was an English Liberal Party politician, and barrister.

He was the only son of Robert (1800–1860) and Elizabeth (née Turner) Hopwood (d. 1874). His paternal grandfather, also named Robert, was the second mayor of Blackburn. He was called to the bar at Middle Temple on 1 May 1854.

At the 1857 general election, he was elected unopposed as the Member of Parliament (MP) for the Clitheroe in Lancashire. He was returned unopposed in 1859, and stood down from the House of Commons at the 1865 general election.

On 7 April 1858, Hopwood married Mary Augusta Henrietta Coventry (1841–1894), the granddaughter of George Coventry, 8th Earl of Coventry. Their son, Aubrey Hopwood, was a novelist who co-wrote the lyrics for A Runaway Girl, The Lucky Star, and Alice in Wonderland. Their third son, Rear Admiral Ronald Arthur Hopwood (1868–1949) was referred to as the "poet laureate" of the Royal Navy by Time Magazine.

Hopwood had a particular passion for organ music and had a pipe organ installed in his home. The instrument is now in the Parr Hall Warrington.

Parliament of the United Kingdom
Preceded by Le Gendre Starkie	Member of Parliament for Clitheroe; 1857 – 1865	Succeeded by Richard Fort
