= Minuscule 548 =

- New Testament manuscript
- Text: Gospels †
- Date: 11th century
- Script: Greek
- Found: 1834
- Now at: British Library
- Size: 15.8 cm by 11.7 cm
- Type: Byzantine text-type
- Category: V

Minuscule 548 (in the Gregory-Aland numbering), ε 1015 (in the Soden numbering), is a Greek minuscule manuscript of the New Testament, on parchment. Palaeographically it has been assigned to the 11th century. Scrivener labelled it by number 535.

== Description ==
The codex contains the text of the four Gospels on 166 parchment leaves (size 15.8 cm by 11.7 cm), with one lacunae (John 16:27-19:40). It is written in one column per page, 26 lines per page.

The text is divided according to the κεφαλαια (chapters), whose numbers are given at the margin, and the τιτλοι (titles of chapters) at the top of the pages. There is also a division according to the Ammonian Sections, (no references to the Eusebian Canons).

It contains tables of the κεφαλαια (tables of contents) before every Gospel, illuminated headpieces, and pictures. There is a musical notation on the first four leaves, and the first nine lines of St. John are in gold.

== Text ==
The Greek text of the codex is a representative of the Byzantine text-type. Hermann von Soden included it to the textual family K^{x}. Aland placed it in Category V. According to the Claremont Profile Method it represents K^{x} in Luke 1 and Luke 20. In Luke 10 no profile was made.

== History ==
Formerly the manuscript was held in the monastery Mar Saba. In 1834 Robert Curzon, Lord Zouche, brought this manuscript to England (along with the codices 552, 553, and 554). The entire collection of Curzon was bequeathed by his daughter in 1917 to the British Museum, where it had been deposited, by his son, since 1876.

The manuscripts was added to the list of the New Testament manuscript by F. H. A. Scrivener (535) and C. R. Gregory (548). It was examined by Scrivener, Burgon, and Gregory (in 1883).

It is currently housed at the British Library (Add MS 39591) in London.

== See also ==
- List of New Testament minuscules
- Biblical manuscript
- Textual criticism
