= Alfred Davies (Labour politician) =

British politician

Alfred Davies (1871 – 3 December 1940) was a British Labour Party politician who sat in the House of Commons from 1918 to 1922.

Born in Stockport, Davies became a cotton spinner, working in Hollingworth. He became active in the Hyde Operative Cotton Spinners' Association, serving on its executive.

Davies was elected at the 1918 general election as the Member of Parliament (MP) for the Clitheroe division of Lancashire, but was defeated at the 1922 general election. He contested the seat again in 1923, but without success.

Parliament of the United Kingdom
Preceded by Albert Smith	Member of Parliament for Clitheroe; 1918–1922	Succeeded by William Brass
