= Minuscule 552 =

- New Testament manuscript
- Text: Gospels
- Date: 12th century
- Script: Greek
- Found: 1834
- Now at: British Library
- Size: 20.9 cm by 15.4 cm
- Type: Byzantine text-type / mixed
- Category: none
- Note: marginalia

Minuscule 552 (in the Gregory-Aland numbering), ε 252 (in the Soden numbering), is a Greek minuscule manuscript of the New Testament, on parchment. Palaeographically it has been assigned to the 12th century. Scrivener labelled it by number 539. The manuscript has complex contents.

== Description ==
The codex contains a complete text of the four Gospels on 252 parchment leaves (size 20.9 cm by 15.4 cm). The writing is in one column per page, 27 lines per page.

The text is divided according to the κεφαλαια (chapters), whose numbers are given at the margin, and the τιτλοι (titles of chapters) at the top of the pages. There is also a division according to the smaller Ammonian Sections, but without references to the Eusebian Canons.

It contains tables of the κεφαλαια (only to Luke).

== Text ==
Kurt Aland did not place the Greek text of the codex in any Category. According to the Claremont Profile Method it represents the textual family K^{x} in Luke 1 and Luke 20. In Luke 10 it belongs to the group M106. It belongs also to the textual cluster 1053 in Luke 1 and Luke 20.

It has an unusual reading. The text of Luke 22:43-44 is omitted.

== History ==
The manuscript was held in the monastery Mar Saba. In 1834 Robert Curzon, Lord Zouche, brought this manuscript to England (along with the codices 548, 553, 554). The entire collection of Curzon was bequeathed by his daughter in 1917 to the British Museum, where it had been deposited, by his son, since 1876.

The manuscripts were added to the list of the New Testament minuscule manuscripts by F. H. A. Scrivener (539) and C. R. Gregory (552).

The manuscript was examined by Scrivener, Dean Burgon, and Gregory (in 1883).

It is currently housed at the British Library (Add MS 39595) in London.

== See also ==
- List of New Testament minuscules
- Biblical manuscript
- Textual criticism
