= 1868 Clitheroe by-election =

UK parliamentary by-election

The 1868 Clitheroe by-election was held on 13 July 1868, following the death of the incumbent Liberal MP, Richard Fort. It was won by the Conservative Party candidate Ralph Assheton, who stood unopposed.
