= Peregrine Cust (1791–1873) =

British Tory Member of Parliament

- Born: 13 August 1791
- Died: 15 October 1873 (aged 82)
- Spouses: Lady Isabella Mary Montagu-Scott (m. 1823; died 1829) Mary Sophia Townshend (m. 1833; died 1852) Frances Steer (m. 1860; died 1869)
- Parent(s): Brownlow Cust, 1st Baron Brownlow; Frances Bankes

Lieutenant-Colonel Peregrine Francis Cust (13 August 1791 – 15 September 1873) was a British Tory Member of Parliament (MP).

Cust was the son of Brownlow Cust, 1st Baron Brownlow, by Frances, daughter of Sir Henry Bankes, of Wimbledon. He was the brother of John Cust, 1st Earl Brownlow, William Cust and Sir Edward Cust, 1st Baronet. He was returned to Parliament at the 1818 general election as one of two members for the borough of Honiton in Devon, and re-elected there in 1820.

He did not stand again at Honiton in 1826, when was returned instead as one of the two MPs for the borough of Clitheroe in Lancashire. He held that seat for six years, until the 1832 general election, when the Great Reform Act reduced the borough to one seat and Cust did not seek re-election.

Cust was married three times. He married firstly Lady Isabella Mary, daughter of Charles Montagu-Scott, 4th Duke of Buccleuch, in 1823. After her early death in October 1829 he married secondly Mary Sophia, daughter of John Townshend, 2nd Viscount Sydney, in 1833. After her death in December 1852 he married thirdly Frances, daughter of Charles Steer and widow of Augustus Keppel, 5th Earl of Albemarle, in 1860. There were children only from the first marriage. Frances died in May 1869. Cust remained a widower until his death in September 1873, aged 82.

Parliament of the United Kingdom
Preceded by Richard Howard Vyse; George Robinson	Member of Parliament for Honiton; 1818–1826; With: Samuel Crawley	Succeeded by John Josiah Guest; Harry Baines Lott
Preceded by Robert Curzon; Henry Porcher	Member of Parliament for Clitheroe; 1826–1832; With: Robert Curzon 1826–1831; Robert Curzon 1831–1832	Succeeded by John Fort (representation reduced to one member 1832)
