= William White (MP for Clitheroe) =

English politician

William White (16 February 1606 – c. 1661) was an English politician who sat in the House of Commons at various times between 1645 and 1660.

White was the son of William White of Duffield, Derbyshire and his second wife Sarah Cradock, daughter of Matthew Cradock of Stafford. He was a student at Inner Temple in 1646.

White was a colonel in the service of the commonwealth. In 1645 he was elected Member of Parliament for Pontefract as a recruiter to the Long Parliament.

In April 1660, White was elected MP for Clitheroe in the Convention Parliament but was unseated on petition on 16 July.

White died between 6 September 1660 when he made his will and 3 September 1662 when it was proved.

White married firstly Margaret Talbot, daughter of Thomas Talbot of Bashall in about 1629 but they had no children. He married secondly on 14 August 1649 Frances Barkham, daughter of Sir Edward Barkham, 1st Baronet of Tottenham, Middlesex.
