= Richard Fort (Liberal politician, born 1822) =

British politician (1822–1868)

Richard Fort (1822 – 2 July 1868) was a Liberal Party politician in England.

He was the son of industrialist John Fort of Read Hall, a Manchester calico printer and MP for Clitheroe. He succeeded his father in 1842. He was appointed High Sheriff of Lancashire for 1854.

He was elected as Member of Parliament for Clitheroe at the 1865 general election, and held the seat until his death in 1868.

His son Richard was Clitheroe's MP from 1880 to 1885, and his grandson, also called Richard Fort was MP for Clitheroe from 1950 to 1959.

Parliament of the United Kingdom
Preceded by John Turner Hopwood	Member of Parliament for Clitheroe; 1865–1868	Succeeded by Ralph Assheton
