= Minuscule 910 =

- New Testament manuscript
- Text: New Testament
- Date: 11th century
- Script: Greek
- Found: 1834
- Now at: British Library
- Size: 26.2 cm by 20.5 cm
- Type: Byzantine text-type
- Category: V

Minuscule 910 (in the Gregory-Aland numbering), α168 (von Soden), is an 11th-century Greek minuscule manuscript of the New Testament on parchment.

== Description ==
The codex contains the text of the Book of Acts, Catholic epistles, and Pauline epistles, on 268 parchment leaves (size 26.2 cm by 20.5 cm). It has lacuna in Acts 20:20-35, the text of Acts 7:27-9:40 was relocated after Romans 3:16.

The text is written in one column per page, 18 lines per page.

It contains subscriptions at the end of each book with numbers of στιχοι.

== Text ==
The Greek text of the codex is a representative of the Byzantine text-type. Kurt Aland placed it in Category V.

== History ==
According to the colophon the manuscript was written in 1009 by Kiryllos Skythopulos. Currently the manuscript is dated by the INTF to the 11th century.

It was bought by Robert Curzon in 1834 in the monastery of Saba. C. R. Gregory saw it in 1883. Facsimile was published in Parham Catalogue.

The manuscript was added to the list of New Testament manuscripts by Scrivener (216^{a}, 234^{p}) and Gregory (226^{a}, 281^{p}). In 1908 Gregory gave the number 910 to it.

It is currently housed in the British Library (Add MS 39598) in London.

== See also ==
- List of New Testament minuscules
- Minuscule 909
- Biblical manuscript
- Textual criticism
