= Richard Fort (Liberal politician, born 1856) =

English politician (1856–1918)

Fort in 1880

Richard Fort (29 Jul 1856 – 30 Jun 1918) was an English Liberal politician who sat in the House of Commons from 1880 to 1885.

Fort was the son of Richard Fort MP for Clitheroe and his wife Margaret Ellen Smith, daughter of Major-General John N Smith HEICS. He was educated at Eton College and Brasenose College, Oxford. He joined the 11th Hussars in 1878 and became a lieutenant in 1880. He was a J.P. for Lancashire.

Fort was elected as Member of Parliament for Clitheroe at the 1880 general election, a seat previously held by his father. He stood down at the 1885 general election, and did not stand for Parliament again.

His nephew, also called Richard Fort, was MP for Clitheroe from 1950 to 1959.

Parliament of the United Kingdom
Preceded by Ralph Assheton	Member of Parliament for Clitheroe; 1880–1885	Succeeded by Sir Ughtred Kay-Shuttleworth
