= Minuscule 554 =

- New Testament manuscript
- Text: Gospels
- Date: 1271/1272
- Script: Greek
- Found: 1834
- Now at: British Library
- Size: 14.3 cm by 11 cm
- Type: Byzantine text-type
- Category: V

Minuscule 554 (in the Gregory-Aland numbering), ε 332 (in the Soden numbering), is a Greek minuscule manuscript of the New Testament, on parchment. It is dated by a Colophon to the year 1271 or 1272. Scrivener labelled it by number 541.

== Description ==
The codex contains a complete text of the four Gospels on 230 parchment leaves (size 14.3 cm by 11 cm). The writing is in one column per page, 20-22 lines per page. It contains numerals of the κεφαλαια at the margin, the τιτλοι, and lectionary markings at the margin.

The text of Luke 1:34-56 was supplied by a later hand.

== Text ==
The Greek text of the codex is a representative of the Byzantine text-type. Hermann von Soden classified it to the textual family K^{x}. Aland placed it in Category V. According to the Claremont Profile Method it represents the textual family K^{x} in Luke 10 and Luke 20. In Luke 1 it has mixed Byzantine text.

The Pericope Adulterae (John 7:53-8:11) is omitted.

== History ==
The manuscript was held in the monastery Mar Saba. In 1834 Robert Curzon, Lord Zouche, brought this manuscript to England (along with the codices 548, 552, 554). The entire collection of Curzon was bequeathed by his daughter in 1917 to the British Museum, where it had been deposited, by his son, since 1876.

The manuscripts was added to the list of the New Testament minuscule manuscripts by F. H. A. Scrivener (541) and C. R. Gregory (553).

The manuscript was examined by Scrivener, Dean Burgon, and Gregory.

It is currently housed at the British Library (Add MS 39597) in London.

== See also ==
- List of New Testament minuscules
- Biblical manuscript
- Textual criticism
