= Le Gendre Starkie (1828–1899) =

English landowner and politician

Le Gendre Nicholas Starkie (10 January 1828 – 13 April 1899 (Padiham)) was an English landowner and Liberal Party politician who sat in the House of Commons from 1853 to 1857.

Starkie was the son of Le Gendre Nicholas Starkie of Huntroyde Hall, Padiham, Lancashire (a former Member of Parliament for Pontefract) and his wife Anne Chamberlain, daughter of Abraham Chamberlain of Rylstone, Yorkshire. He was educated at Uppingham School and Trinity College, Cambridge being awarded BA in 1851 and MA in 1854. He was admitted at Inner Temple on 11 June 1853. He inherited Huntroyde Hall on the death of his father in 1865.

In August 1853 Starkie was elected at a by-election as the Member of Parliament (MP) for the borough of Clitheroe in Lancashire. He held the seat until the 1857 general election, when he did not stand again.

He was JP and Deputy Lieutenant for Lancashire and in 1868 he was High Sheriff of Lancashire. He served in the 2nd Royal Lancashire Militia and later the 5th Royal Lancashire Militia (which became the 3rd Battalion, East Lancashire Regiment), being promoted to its command with the rank of Lieutenant-Colonel on 3 September 1879.

Like his father before him, he was a prominent Freemason and was Provincial Grand Master (and Grand Superintendent) of the Province of Lancashire (Eastern Division) from 1870 till his death.

Starkie married Jemima Monica Mildred Tempest, daughter of Henry Tempest of Loscock Hall, Lancashire on 15 October 1867 at the British Embassy in Paris. They had three sons, the eldest of which, Edmund Arthur Le Gendre, inherited Huntroyde. He died at Huntroyde at the age of 71.

Parliament of the United Kingdom
Preceded by John Aspinall	Member of Parliament for Clitheroe; 1853 – 1857	Succeeded by John Turner Hopwood
