= Robert Curzon, 14th Baron Zouche =

English traveller, diplomat and author

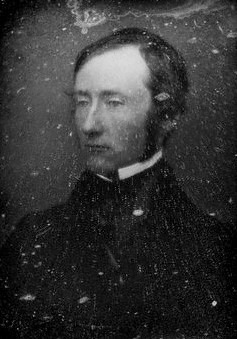
Curzon circa 1840s

Robert Curzon, 14th Baron Zouche (16 March 1810 – 2 August 1873), styled The Honourable Robert Curzon between 1829 and 1870, was an English traveller, diplomat and author, active in the Near East. He was responsible for acquiring several important and late Biblical manuscripts from Eastern Orthodox monasteries.

== Early life ==
Curzon was the son of the Hon. Robert Curzon, younger son of Assheton Curzon, 1st Viscount Curzon, and his wife Harriet Anne Bishopp, 13th Baroness Zouche (Bishopp also spelt Bisshopp). Baroness Zouche succeeded to the Barony from her father Sir Cecil Bisshopp the 8th Baronet Bishopp, of Parham Park in the county of (today) West Sussex (from 1815 the 12th Baron Zouche of Hayngworth) after her brother Lieutenant-Colonel Cecil Bisshopp and Sir Cecil's heir was killed in the War of 1812 against the Americans. The Bishopp Baronetcy was inherited by a cousin. Curzon was educated at Charterhouse School. He matriculated at Christ Church, Oxford in 1828.

== Career ==
In 1831, he succeeded his father as member of parliament for Clitheroe, a seat he only held until the following year.

In 1842-1843 Curzon was joint British Commissioner in Erzurum as part of the British-Turkish-Persian-Russian boundary commission sitting to delineate the Turkish and Persian frontier.

=== Manuscripts ===
In 1834, he brought some manuscripts from Palestine (including the Greek New Testament codices 548, 552-554) and in 1837 from the Athos peninsula, among them the important Bulgarian Gospels of Tsar Ivan Alexander and the gospel codices 547, 549-551, 910-911). After his death, they were first loaned to the British Museum, then donated by his daughter. They have since been transferred to the British Library.

In his Visits to Monasteries in the Levant (1849), he described and justified his takings. He visited Mount Athos in 1837, and at the Monastery of St Paul, he recounts how the abbot said "We make no use of the old books, and should be glad if you would accept one'", upon which he took two, including a fourteenth-century illuminated Bulgarian gospel, now in the British Library.

== Last years and succession ==
Lord Zouche succeeded his mother in the barony in 1870. He died in August 1873, aged 63, and was succeeded in the title firstly by his son Robert Nathaniel Cecil George Curzon the 15th Baron (born 12 Jul 1851, died 31 Jul 1915) and then by his daughter Darea Curzon, 16th Baroness Zouche (born 13 Nov 1860, died 7 Apr 1917). Upon the death of his daughter, the "Zouche Collection" was bequeathed to the British Museum.

== Works ==
- Visits to Monasteries in the Levant. London. 1849.
- Armenia: A year at Erzeroom, and on the frontiers of Russia, Turkey, and Persia. London. 1854.

== See also ==
- Obituary in The Times

Parliament of the United Kingdom
Preceded by Hon. Robert Curzon; Hon. Peregrine Cust	Member of Parliament for Clitheroe; 1831–1832; With: Hon. Peregrine Cust	Succeeded by John Fort reduced to one member
Peerage of England
Preceded by Harriet Bissopp	Baron Zouche; 1870–1873	Succeeded by Robert Curzon
