= Richard Fort (Conservative politician) =

British politician (1907–1959)

Richard Fort (8 August 1907 – 16 May 1959) was a British industrial chemist and politician. He was elected as a Conservative Party Member of Parliament from 1950 but was killed in a car accident in 1959 at the age of 51.

== Training ==
Fort's father was second Master of Winchester College; he was himself sent to Eton College from where he went to New College, Oxford. In 1930 he graduated with an honours degree in Chemistry, and went to the Technische Hochschule in Vienna where he studied industrial chemistry.

== Industrial chemistry ==
On his return to England in 1932, Fort was employed by Imperial Chemical Industries as junior works manager in the company's Cheshire alkali factories. He was then promoted and in 1938 became President of ICI (New York) Ltd, but in 1940 he joined the British Purchasing Mission and the British Supply Mission set up by the British government to buy wartime supplies from the United States. He was transferred to the Ministry of Supply in London the next year, working in the small arms ammunition department, where he stayed until the end of the war.

== Clitheroe campaigning ==
At the 1945 general election, Fort was chosen as Conservative Party candidate for Clitheroe, which his uncle had represented from 1880 to 1885, and his grandfather from 1865 to 1868. However, Fort lost the election by 2,647 votes. He returned to ICI as a technical consultant, and was readopted for Clitheroe; he spent the term of the Parliament 'nursing' the constituency.

== Local industries ==
When the 1950 general election came around, Fort won the seat at his second attempt with a majority of 2,455. He made his maiden speech in a debate on the 1950 budget, arguing that rates of taxation were so high that they denied the incentive of giving a man more money when he did more work. In his early Parliamentary career he often spoke in defence of local industries, including the cotton industry, and dairy farmers. He was one of the authors of "One Nation", a highly influential pamphlet published in autumn 1950.

== Freedom for state corporations ==
Re-elected with a majority increased to 4,425 in the 1951 general election, Fort was appointed Parliamentary Private Secretary to Florence Horsbrugh, the Minister of Education, until 1954. He supported the Conservative government's Transport Bill, arguing that the freedom of railways to set their own freight charges would allow road and rail to compete and work out the best way of carrying goods. He welcomed a ministerial inquiry into the costs of the National Health Service and called for greater independence for its regional boards.

== Attitude to science ==
Fort gave support to the establishment of the Atomic Energy Authority but asked why the Government did not intend to allow it to become self-supporting or to borrow money freely. He complained at remarks by fellow Conservative MP John Eden, who had opposed the chemical manipulation of foodstuffs; Fort said that prolonged investigations were undertaken to make sure food additives were safe. In March 1955 he presented a Private Members' Bill to require simultaneous elections of Rural District Councils with Parish councils, and to put the cost of elections to Parish councils on to the Rural District.

His scientific background led to an appointment as a lay member of the Medical Research Council in 1955. In January 1956 Fort succeeded in persuading the Government to withdraw a proposal whereby the General Dental Council would carry out staffing experiments with ancillary staff rather than the Privy Council. He moved an amendment in April 1957 which would allow the Central Electricity Generating Board to issue stock and borrow money with Ministry approval; he argued that they needed to use their capital to the best possible advantage.

== Salk vaccine ==
When the Parliamentary Conservative Party set up a sub-committee dealing with atomic energy after the Windscale Fire, Fort was picked to chair it. In 1958 he took up the issue of the Salk vaccine against Poliomyelitis, which he had debated in the Medical Research Council. He defended the MRC decision to allow the vaccine, and pressed for more vaccine to be made available for use.

In June 1958 he abstained on a three-line whip after a debate on the cotton industry, failing to support Government policy, along with six other MPs representing affected constituencies. From 1957 he was Chairman of the Parliamentary and Scientific Committee, and became a governor of Imperial College. Fort contributed an essay to "The Responsible Society", a collection of 11 essays written by members of the 'One Nation' group which was published in March 1959.

== Car accident death ==
On Saturday 16 May 1959, Fort was driving his car on the road from Oxford to Henley-on-Thames near Nuneham Courtenay when it had a head-on collision with a coach. Fort was killed instantly; passengers on the coach reported that he had been slumped at the wheel immediately before the crash. An inquest into his death found no signs of illness or disease (he did have a gallstone), and the coroner found that he had lost control of his car. The inquest returned a verdict of accidental death. He was survived by his wife and five children. His children included the journalist Matthew Fort and the writer Tom Fort.

Parliament of the United Kingdom
Preceded by Harry Randall	Member of Parliament for Clitheroe; 1950 – 1959	Succeeded by Francis Pearson
