= Clitheroe (constituency) =

Parliamentary constituency in the United Kingdom, 1832–1983

- Former county constituency for the House of Commons
- Clitheroe in Lancashire, showing boundaries used from 1974–1983
- County: Lancashire

1885–1983
- Seats: 1
- Replaced by: Ribble Valley, Burnley, Hyndburn and Pendle

1559–1885
- Seats: 1559–1832: Two; 1832–1885: One
- Type of constituency: Borough constituency

Clitheroe was a parliamentary constituency in Lancashire.

The town of Clitheroe was first enfranchised as a parliamentary borough in 1559, returning two Members of Parliament (MPs) to the House of Commons of England until 1707, then to the House of Commons of Great Britain until 1800, and finally to the House of Commons of the Parliament of the United Kingdom until 1832. The borough's representation was reduced to one MP by the Reform Act 1832.

The parliamentary borough was abolished under the Redistribution of Seats Act 1885, and the name transferred to a new county division with effect from the 1885 general election. The county division returned one MP until it was abolished for the 1983 general election. It was then largely replaced by the new Ribble Valley constituency.

== Boundaries ==
1885–1918: The Boroughs of Clitheroe and Burnley, the Sessional Division of Colne, and parts of the Sessional Divisions of Clitheroe and Burnley.

1918–1950: The Borough of Clitheroe, the Urban Districts of Great Harwood and Padiham, the Rural District of Clitheroe, and part of the Rural District of Burnley.

1950–1983: The Borough of Clitheroe, the Urban Districts of Great Harwood, Longridge, and Padiham, the Rural Districts of Burnley and Clitheroe, and in the Rural District of Preston the parishes of Dutton, Hothersall, and Ribchester.

== Members of Parliament ==
=== Borough of Clitheroe ===
==== MPs 1559–1660 ====
Parliament	First member	Second member
1559 (Jan)	Thomas Greenacres	Walter Horton
1563 (Jan)	Thomas Greenacres	John Jeffrey
1571	Richard Greenacres	George Horsey
1572	William Wynter	Thomas Docwray
1584	Michael Purefoy	Alexander Fisher
1586	Edmund Poley	John Walmesley
1588 (Oct)	Robert Pilkington	John White
1593	William Twysden	John Chamberlain
1597 (Oct)	William Holte	George Rotheram
1601 (Oct)	John Osbaldestone	Anthony Dering
1604	Sir John Dormer	Martin Lister
1614	Sir Gilbert Hoghton, 2nd Baronet	Clement Coke
1621–1622	Sir Thomas Walmsley	William Fanshawe
1624	William Fanshawe	Ralph Whitfield
1625	Ralph Assheton	William Fanshawe
Jan 1626	Ralph Assheton	George Kirke
Apr 1626	Ralph Assheton	Christopher Hatton
1628	Thomas Jermyn	William Newell
1629–1640	No Parliament summoned	
1640 (Apr)	Sir Ralph Assheton	Richard Shuttleworth, jnr
1640 (Nov)	Sir Ralph Assheton	Richard Shuttleworth, jnr
1645	Sir Ralph Assheton	Richard Shuttleworth, jnr
1648	Richard Shuttleworth, jnr	
1653–1660	Clitheroe not represented in Barebones or Protectorate Parliaments	

==== MPs 1660–1832 ====
Two members returned to Parliament

Year	First member	First party	Second member	Second party
Apr 1660	Sir Ralph Assheton		William White	
Jul 1660	Sir Ralph Assheton		William Hulton	
Apr 1661	Sir Ralph Assheton		John Heath	
1662	Ambrose Pudsay		John Heath	
1675	Sir Thomas Stringer		John Heath	
1679	Sir Thomas Stringer		Sir Ralph Assheton	
1680	Sir Thomas Stringer		Henry Marsden	
1685	Lord Strange		Edmund Assheton	
1689	Anthony Parker		Christopher Wilkinson	
1690	Anthony Parker		Roger Kenyon	
1693	Fitton Gerard		Roger Kenyon	
1695	Christopher Lister		Ambrose Pudsay	
1698	Christopher Lister		Thomas Stringer	
1701	Ambrose Pudsay		Thomas Stringer	
1705	Edward Harvey		Thomas Stringer	
1707	Edward Harvey		Daniel Harvey	
1708	Edward Harvey		Christopher Parker	
Apr 1713	Thomas Lister I		Christopher Parker	
Sep 1713	Thomas Lister I		Charles Zedenno Stanley	
1715	Thomas Lister I		Edward Harvey	
1722	Thomas Lister I		Nathaniel Curzon	
1727	Thomas Lister I		The Viscount Galway	
1734	Thomas Lister I		William Curzon	
1745	Thomas Lister II		William Curzon	
1747	Thomas Lister II		Nathaniel Curzon	
1754	Thomas Lister II	Tory	Assheton Curzon	Tory
Dec 1761 by-election	Nathaniel Lister	Tory	Assheton Curzon	Tory
1773 by-election	Thomas Lister III	Tory	Assheton Curzon	Tory
1780	Thomas Lister III	Tory	John Parker	Tory
1782 by-election	Thomas Lister III	Tory	John Lee	Tory
1790	Sir John Aubrey, Bt	Tory	Penn Curzon	Tory
1792 by-election	Sir John Aubrey, Bt	Tory	Assheton Curzon	Tory
1795 by-election	Sir John Aubrey, Bt	Tory	Richard Erle-Drax-Grosvenor	Tory
1796	Lord Edward Bentinck	Tory	Hon. Robert Curzon	Tory
1802	Hon. John Cust	Tory	Hon. Robert Curzon	Tory
1808 by-election	James Gordon	Tory	Hon. Robert Curzon	Tory
Oct 1812	Viscount Castlereagh	Tory	Hon. Robert Curzon	Tory
Dec 1812 by-election	Edward Wilbraham-Bootle	Tory	Hon. Robert Curzon	Tory
1818	Hon. William Cust	Tory	Hon. Robert Curzon	Tory
1822 by-election	Henry Porcher	Tory	Hon. Robert Curzon	Tory
1826	Hon. Peregrine Cust	Tory	Hon. Robert Curzon	Tory
1831	Hon. Peregrine Cust	Tory	Hon. Robert Curzon	Tory

==== MPs 1832–1885 ====
Election	Member	Party
1832	representation reduced to one member	
1832	John Fort	Whig
1841	Mathew Wilson	Whig
1842	Edward Cardwell	Conservative
1847	Mathew Wilson	Whig
May 1853 by-election	John Aspinall	Conservative
Aug 1853 by-election	Le Gendre Starkie	Peelite
1857	John Turner Hopwood	Conservative
1865	Richard Fort	Liberal
1868 by-election	Ralph Assheton	Conservative
1880	Richard Fort	Liberal
1885	Parliamentary borough abolished. Name transferred to new county division	

=== Clitheroe division of Lancashire ===
==== MPs 1885–1983 ====
Election	Member	Party	Notes
1885	Sir Ughtred Kay-Shuttleworth	Liberal	
1902 by-election	David Shackleton	Labour	
1910	Albert Smith	Labour	
1918	Alfred Davies	Labour	
1922	Sir William Brass	Conservative	
1945	Harry Randall	Labour	
1950	Richard Fort	Conservative	
1959	Sir Francis Pearson	Conservative	
1970	David Walder	Conservative	Died October 1978
1979 by-election	David Waddington	Conservative	
1983	constituency abolished: see Ribble Valley		

== Election results ==
=== Elections in the 1970s ===
General election 1979: Clitheroe
Party	Candidate	Votes	%	±%
Conservative	David Waddington	25,081	57.1	+9.1
Labour	Lindsay R. Sutton	13,502	30.7	−0.5
Liberal	Frank Wilson	5,362	12.2	−8.6
Majority		11,579	26.4	+9.6
Turnout		43,945	80.7	+2.1
Conservative hold		Swing		

1979 Clitheroe by-election
Party	Candidate	Votes	%	±%
Conservative	David Waddington	22,185	65.0	+17.0
Labour	Lindsay R. Sutton	9,685	28.4	−2.8
Liberal	Frank Wilson	2,242	6.6	−14.2
Majority		12,500	36.6	+19.8
Turnout		34,112		
Conservative hold		Swing	+9.9	

General election October 1974: Clitheroe
Party	Candidate	Votes	%	±%
Conservative	David Walder	19,643	48.0	+0.2
Labour	Barry McColgan	12,775	31.2	+3.2
Liberal	C. William Roberts	8,503	20.8	−3.4
Majority		6,868	16.8	−3.0
Turnout		40,921	78.6	−5.1
Conservative hold		Swing	−1.5	

General election February 1974: Clitheroe
Party	Candidate	Votes	%	±%
Conservative	David Walder	20,613	47.8	−3.8
Labour	Michael Walsh	12,085	28.0	−7.8
Liberal	C. William Roberts	10,438	24.2	+11.6
Majority		8,528	19.8	+4.0
Turnout		43,136	83.7	+4.4
Conservative hold		Swing	+2.0	

General election 1970: Clitheroe
Party	Candidate	Votes	%	±%
Conservative	David Walder	20,430	51.6	+5.5
Labour	Kenneth C Bodfish	14,158	35.8	−4.3
Liberal	Vera Ida Macmillan	4,965	12.6	−1.2
Majority		6,272	15.8	+9.8
Turnout		39,553	79.3	−4.2
Conservative hold		Swing	+4.9	

=== Elections in the 1960s ===
General election 1966: Clitheroe
Party	Candidate	Votes	%	±%
Conservative	Francis Pearson	17,244	46.1	−2.7
Labour	Robert Hodge	15,014	40.1	+2.6
Liberal	Vera Ida Macmillan	5,168	13.8	+0.1
Majority		2,230	6.0	−5.3
Turnout		37,426	83.5	−1.8
Conservative hold		Swing	−2.7	

General election 1964: Clitheroe
Party	Candidate	Votes	%	±%
Conservative	Francis Pearson	18,559	48.8	−9.3
Labour	Doug Hoyle	14,278	37.5	−4.4
Liberal	Martin Strange	5,209	13.7	New
Majority		4,281	11.3	−4.9
Turnout		38,046	85.3	−1.3
Conservative hold		Swing	−2.5	

=== Elections in the 1950s ===
General election 1959: Clitheroe
Party	Candidate	Votes	%	±%
Conservative	Francis Pearson	22,314	58.1	+1.6
Labour	William Rutter	16,103	41.9	−1.6
Majority		6,211	16.2	+3.2
Turnout		38,417	86.6	+1.3
Conservative hold		Swing	+1.6	

General election 1955: Clitheroe
Party	Candidate	Votes	%	±%
Conservative	Richard Fort	21,615	56.5	+1.2
Labour	William Rutter	16,671	43.5	−1.2
Majority		4,944	13.0	+2.4
Turnout		38,286	85.3	−4.8
Conservative hold		Swing	+1.2	

General election 1951: Clitheroe
Party	Candidate	Votes	%	±%
Conservative	Richard Fort	23,007	55.3	+5.7
Labour	Harold Bradley	18,582	44.7	+0.9
Majority		4,425	10.6	+4.8
Turnout		41,589	90.1	−1.6
Conservative hold		Swing	+2.4	

General election 1950: Clitheroe
Party	Candidate	Votes	%	±%
Conservative	Richard Fort	20,814	49.6	+3.6
Labour	Harry Randall	18,359	43.8	−9.8
Liberal	James Willie Wyers	2,765	6.6	New
Majority		2,455	5.8	N/A
Turnout		41,938	91.7	+8.3
Conservative gain from Labour		Swing		

=== Elections in the 1940s ===
General election 1945: Clitheroe
Party	Candidate	Votes	%	±%
Labour	Harry Randall	19,443	53.65	
Conservative	Richard Fort	16,796	46.35	
Majority		2,647	7.30	N/A
Turnout		36,239	83.41	
Labour gain from Conservative		Swing		

=== Elections in the 1930s ===
General election 1935: Clitheroe
Party	Candidate	Votes	%	±%
Conservative	William Brass	21,163	54.86	
Labour	Stan Awbery	17,411	45.14	
Majority		3,752	9.72	
Turnout		38,574	87.68	
Conservative hold		Swing		

General election 1931: Clitheroe
Party	Candidate	Votes	%	±%
Conservative	William Brass	24,361	62.02	
Labour	Stan Awbery	14,920	37.98	
Majority		9,441	24.04	
Turnout		39,281	83.40	
Conservative hold		Swing		

=== Elections in the 1920s ===
General election 1929: Clitheroe
Party	Candidate	Votes	%	±%
Unionist	William Brass	16,035	40.7	−13.5
Labour	William Dobbie	15,592	39.5	−6.3
Liberal	Charles Norman Glidewell	7,826	19.8	New
Majority		443	1.2	−7.2
Turnout		39,453	91.5	+2.9
Registered electors		43,113		
Unionist hold		Swing	−3.6	

General election 1924: Clitheroe
Party	Candidate	Votes	%	±%
Unionist	William Brass	16,637	54.2	+11.3
Labour	Derwent Hall Caine	14,041	45.8	+7.9
Majority		2,596	8.4	+3.4
Turnout		30,678	88.6	+0.4
Registered electors		34,617		
Unionist hold		Swing	+1.7	

General election 1923: Clitheroe
Party	Candidate	Votes	%	±%
Unionist	William Brass	12,998	42.9	−11.8
Labour	Alfred Davies	11,469	37.9	−7.4
Liberal	Harold Derbyshire	5,810	19.2	New
Majority		1,529	5.0	−4.4
Turnout		30,277	88.2	+2.9
Registered electors		34,329		
Unionist hold		Swing	−2.2	

General election 1922: Clitheroe
Party	Candidate	Votes	%	±%
Unionist	William Brass	15,586	54.7	+15.4
Labour	Alfred Davies	12,911	45.3	+0.7
Majority		2,675	9.4	N/A
Turnout		28,497	85.3	+18.8
Registered electors		33,393		
Unionist gain from Labour		Swing	+7.4	

=== Elections in the 1910s ===
General election 1918: Clitheroe
Party		Candidate	Votes	%	±%
	Labour	Alfred Davies	9,578	44.6	−23.1
	Unionist	Edwin Leach Hartley	8,419	39.3	+7.0
C	Liberal	James Henley Batty	3,443	16.1	New
Majority			1,159	5.3	−30.1
Turnout			21,440	66.5	−13.5
Registered electors			32,222		
	Labour hold		Swing	−15.1	
C indicates candidate endorsed by the coalition government.

General election December 1910: Clitheroe
Party	Candidate	Votes	%	±%
Labour	Albert Smith	12,107	67.7	+0.4
Conservative	J.J. Blayney	5,783	32.3	−0.4
Majority		6,324	35.4	+0.8
Turnout		17,890	80.0	−12.1
Registered electors		22,368		
Labour hold		Swing	+0.4	

General election January 1910: Clitheroe
Party	Candidate	Votes	%	±%
Labour	David Shackleton	13,873	67.3	−8.6
Conservative	T. Smith	6,727	32.7	New
Majority		7,146	34.6	−17.2
Turnout		20,600	92.1	+15.1
Registered electors		22,368		
Labour hold		Swing		

=== Elections in the 1900s ===
Belton

1906 general election: Clitheroe
Party	Candidate	Votes	%	±%
Labour Repr. Cmte.	David Shackleton	12,035	75.9	N/A
Ind. Conservative	B.J. Belton	3,828	24.1	New
Majority		8,207	51.8	N/A
Turnout		15,863	77.0	N/A
Registered electors		20,613		
Labour Repr. Cmte. gain from Liberal		Swing	N/A	

Clitheroe by-election, 1 August 1902
Party	Candidate	Votes	%	±%
Labour Repr. Cmte.	David Shackleton	Unopposed		
Labour Repr. Cmte. gain from Liberal				

1900 general election: Clitheroe
Party	Candidate	Votes	%	±%
Liberal	Ughtred Kay-Shuttleworth	Unopposed		
Liberal hold				

=== Elections in the 1890s ===
1895 general election: Clitheroe
Party	Candidate	Votes	%	±%
Liberal	Ughtred Kay-Shuttleworth	Unopposed		
Liberal hold				

1892 general election: Clitheroe
Party	Candidate	Votes	%	±%
Liberal	Ughtred Kay-Shuttleworth	7,657	58.2	N/A
Liberal Unionist	William Briggs	5,506	41.8	New
Majority		2,151	16.4	N/A
Turnout		13,163	86.5	N/A
Registered electors		15,212		
Liberal hold		Swing	N/A	

=== Elections in the 1880s ===
General election 1886: Clitheroe
Party	Candidate	Votes	%	±%
Liberal	Ughtred Kay-Shuttleworth	Unopposed		
Liberal hold				

By-election, 19 Apr 1886: Clitheroe
Party	Candidate	Votes	%	±%
Liberal	Ughtred Kay-Shuttleworth	Unopposed		
Liberal hold				

- Caused by Kay-Shuttleworth's appointment as Chancellor of the Duchy of Lancaster.

1885 general election: Clitheroe
Party	Candidate	Votes	%	±%
Liberal	Ughtred Kay-Shuttleworth	6,821	60.5	+5.5
Conservative	John Thursby	4,462	39.5	−5.5
Majority		2,359	21.0	+11.0
Turnout		11,283	88.9	−5.9
Registered electors		12,698		
Liberal hold		Swing	+5.5	

1880 general election: Clitheroe
Party	Candidate	Votes	%	±%
Liberal	Richard Fort	1,078	55.0	+7.7
Conservative	Ralph Assheton	882	45.0	−7.7
Majority		196	10.0	N/A
Turnout		1,960	94.8	−0.2
Registered electors		2,068		
Liberal gain from Conservative		Swing	+7.7	

=== Elections in the 1870s ===
1874 general election: Clitheroe
Party	Candidate	Votes	%	±%
Conservative	Ralph Assheton	896	52.7	+0.4
Liberal	Edward Ebenezer Kay	804	47.3	−0.4
Majority		92	5.4	+0.8
Turnout		1,700	95.0	+3.9
Registered electors		1,790		
Conservative hold		Swing	+0.4	

=== Elections in the 1860s ===
1868 general election: Clitheroe
Party	Candidate	Votes	%	±%
Conservative	Ralph Assheton	760	52.3	N/A
Liberal	Charles Savile Roundell	693	47.7	N/A
Majority		67	4.6	N/A
Turnout		1,453	91.1	N/A
Registered electors		1,595		
Conservative gain from Liberal				

By-election, 13 Jul 1868: Clitheroe
Party	Candidate	Votes	%	±%
Conservative	Ralph Assheton	Unopposed		
Conservative gain from Liberal				

- Caused by Fort's death.

1865 general election: Clitheroe
Party	Candidate	Votes	%	±%
Liberal	Richard Fort	Unopposed		
Registered electors		438		
Liberal gain from Conservative				

=== Elections in the 1850s ===
1859 general election: Clitheroe
Party	Candidate	Votes	%	±%
Conservative	John Turner Hopwood	Unopposed		
Registered electors		469		
Conservative hold				

1857 general election: Clitheroe
Party	Candidate	Votes	%	±%
Conservative	John Turner Hopwood	Unopposed		
Registered electors		457		
Conservative gain from Whig				

By-election, 23 August 1853: Clitheroe
Party	Candidate	Votes	%	±%
Peelite	Le Gendre Starkie	216	51.3	+5.5
Whig	Jonathan Peel	205	48.7	−5.5
Majority		11	2.6	N/A
Turnout		421	92.3	+1.2
Registered electors		456		
Peelite gain from Whig		Swing	+5.5	

- Caused by the previous by-election being declared void on petition, due to treating.

By-election, 28 May 1853: Clitheroe
Party	Candidate	Votes	%	±%
Conservative	John Aspinall	215	50.8	+5.0
Whig	Richard Fort	208	49.2	−5.0
Majority		7	1.6	N/A
Turnout		423	92.8	+1.7
Registered electors		456		
Conservative gain from Whig		Swing	+5.0	

- Caused by the previous election being declared void on petition, due to bribery, corruption and intimidation.

1852 general election: Clitheroe
Party	Candidate	Votes	%	±%
Whig	Mathew Wilson	221	54.2	N/A
Conservative	John Aspinall	187	45.8	New
Majority		34	8.4	N/A
Turnout		408	91.1	N/A
Registered electors		448		
Whig hold		Swing	N/A	

=== Elections in the 1840s ===
1847 general election: Clitheroe
Party	Candidate	Votes	%	±%
Whig	Mathew Wilson	Unopposed		
Registered electors		504		
Whig hold				

Wilson's election at the 1841 general election was declared void and Cardwell was declared elected on 21 March 1842.

1841 general election: Clitheroe
Party	Candidate	Votes	%	±%
Whig	Mathew Wilson	175	50.7	−0.6
Conservative	Edward Cardwell	170	49.3	+0.6
Majority		5	1.4	−1.4
Turnout		345	89.1	+2.4
Registered electors		387		
Whig hold		Swing		

=== Elections in the 1830s ===
1837 general election: Clitheroe
Party	Candidate	Votes	%	±%
Whig	John Fort	164	51.4	N/A
Conservative	William Whalley	155	48.6	New
Majority		9	2.8	N/A
Turnout		319	86.7	N/A
Registered electors		368		
Whig hold		Swing	N/A	

1835 general election: Clitheroe
Party	Candidate	Votes	%	±%
Whig	John Fort	Unopposed		
Registered electors		351		
Whig hold				

1832 general election: Clitheroe
Party	Candidate	Votes	%	±%
Whig	John Fort	157	55.9	New
Tory	John Irving	124	44.1	N/A
Majority		33	11.8	N/A
Turnout		281	91.8	N/A
Registered electors		306		
Whig gain from Tory		Swing	N/A	

1831 general election: Clitheroe
Party	Candidate	Votes	%	±%
Tory	Peregrine Cust	Unopposed		
Tory	Robert Curzon	Unopposed		
Registered electors		c. 36		
Tory hold				
Tory hold				

1830 general election: Clitheroe
Party	Candidate	Votes	%	±%
Tory	Peregrine Cust	Unopposed		
Tory	Robert Curzon	Unopposed		
Registered electors		c. 36		
Tory hold				
Tory hold				
