= John Cust, 1st Earl Brownlow =

British peer and Tory politician (1779–1853)

John Cust GCH
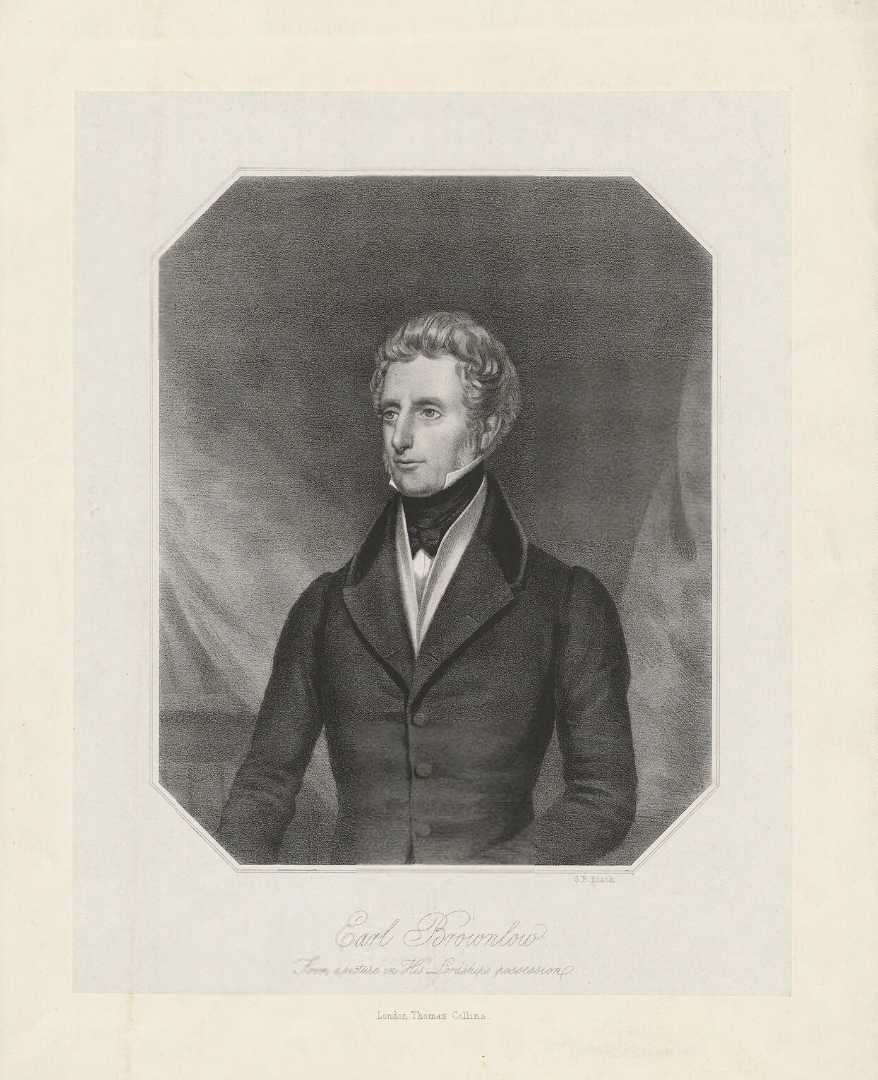

1st Earl Brownlow
- In office 1815–1853

Member of the British Parliament for Clitheroe
- In office 1802–1807

Personal details
- Born: 19 August 1779
- Died: 15 September 1853 (aged 74)
- Spouses: Sophia Hume; Caroline Fludyer; Lady Emma Sophia Edgcumbe
- Children: 7, including John and Charles
- Parents: Brownlow Cust, 1st Baron Brownlow (father); Frances Bankes (mother)

John Cust, 1st Earl Brownlow, GCH (19 August 1779 – 15 September 1853) was a British Peer and Tory politician.

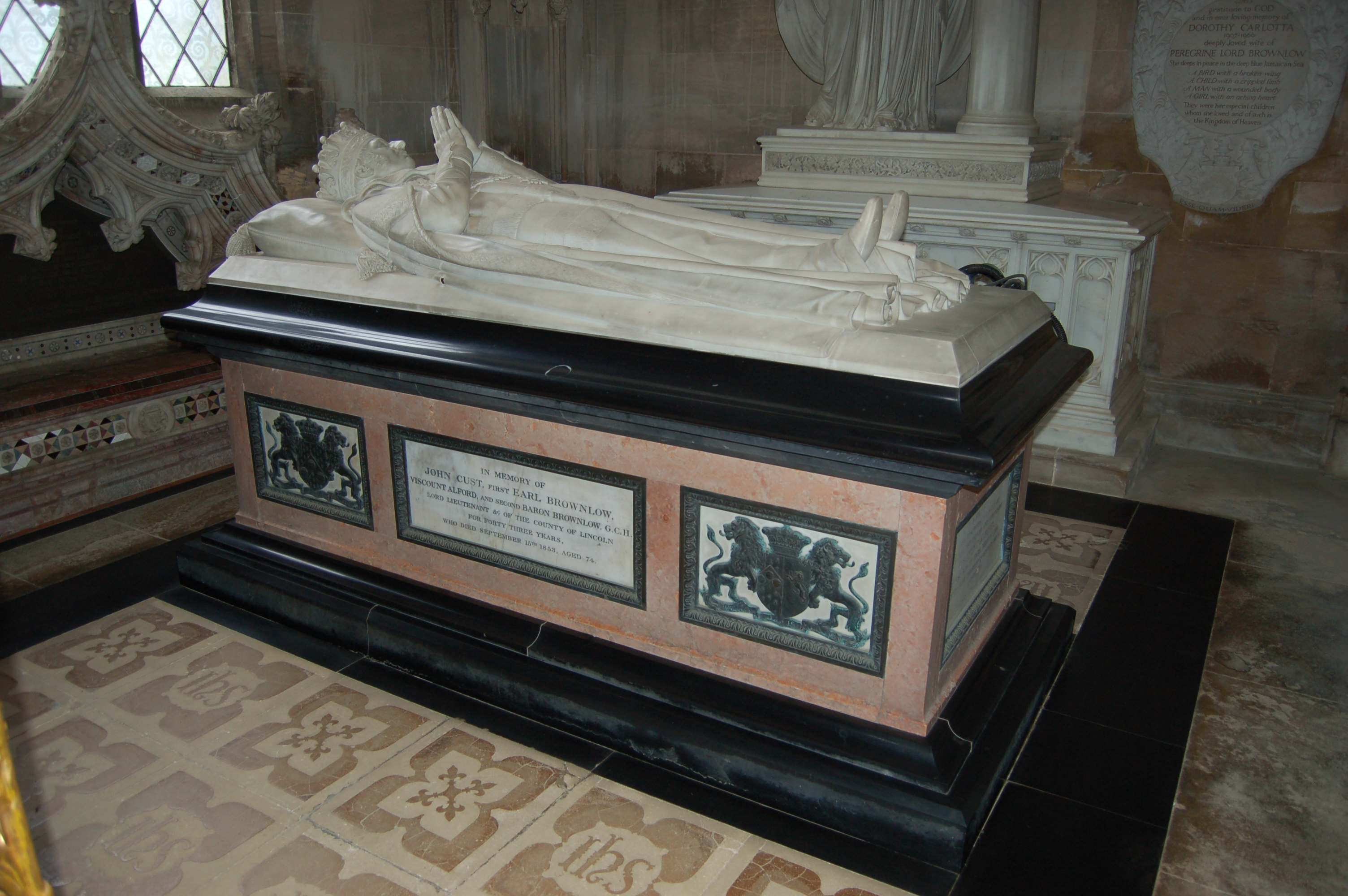
John Cust's funerary monument in Belton Church, Lincolnshire

== Life ==
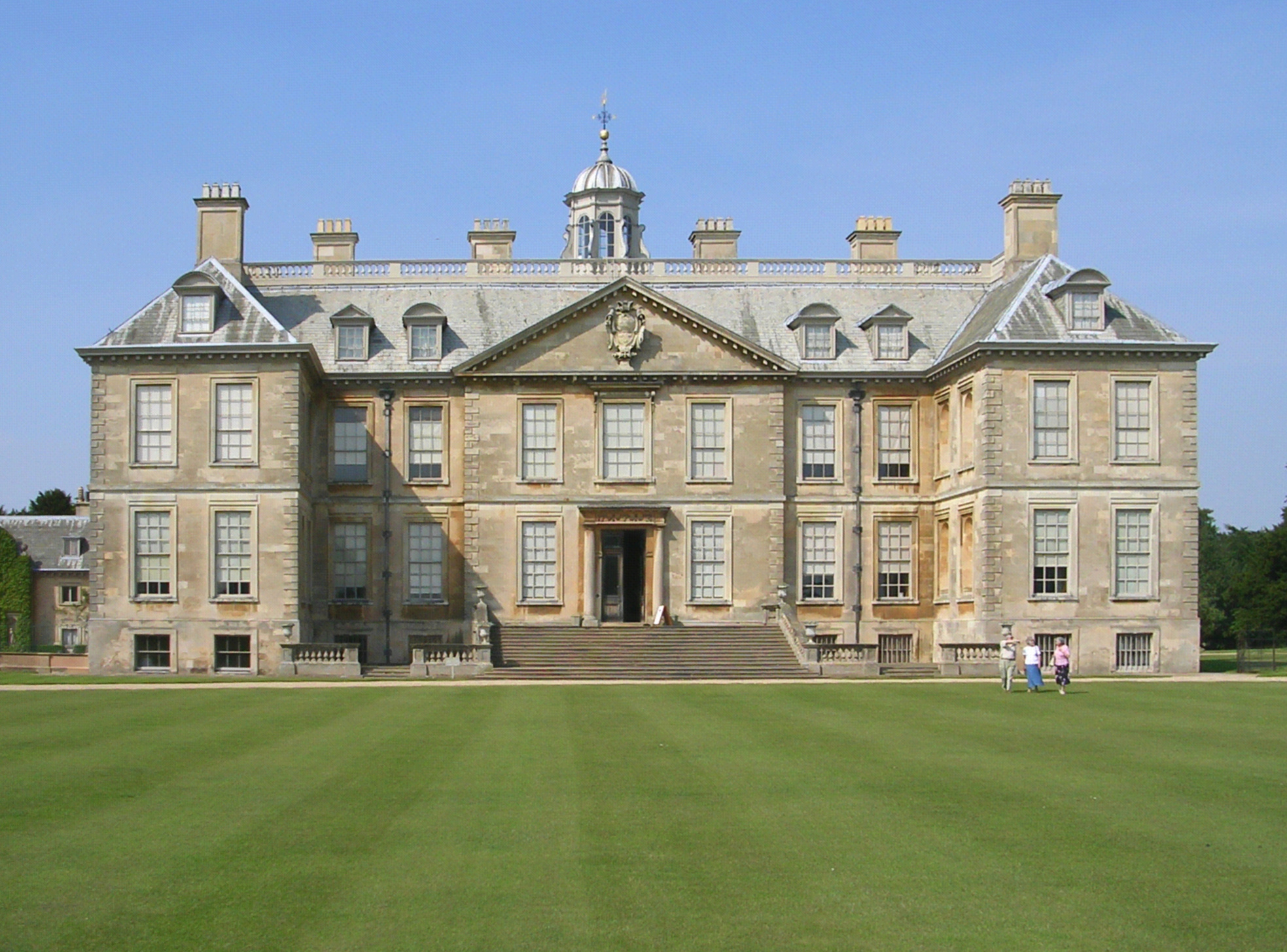
Belton House

Cust was the eldest son of the 1st Baron Brownlow and his second wife, Frances. He was educated at Eton (1788–93) and Trinity College, Cambridge (1797) before undertaking a European tour of Russia and Germany in 1801. In 1802 he was elected the MP for Clitheroe, holding the seat until 1807, when he succeeded his father's title and estates, including Belton House near Grantham, Lincolnshire.

In May 1805, he was elected a Fellow of the Royal Society. From 1809 to 1852, he was Lord Lieutenant of Lincolnshire and in 1815 was created Earl Brownlow and Viscount Alford, of Alford, in the County of Lincoln. He was appointed to the Royal Guelphic Order as a Knight Grand Cross (GCH) in 1834.

According to the Legacies of British Slave-Ownership at the University College London, Brownlow was awarded compensation under the Slave Compensation Act 1837. In 1821, Brownlow's younger brother, Sir Edward Cust, 1st Baronet (1794–1878), had married Mary Anne Boode (1799–1882). Mary was the daughter and heiress of Lewis William and Margaret Boode (née Dannett). The Boodes were a prominent Dutch, slave owning family. Brownlow and Wilbraham Egerton of Tatton Park acted as co-trustees and executors of Margaret Boode's estate when she died in 1827.

== Family ==
On 24 July 1810, Lord Brownlow married Sophia Hume, the second daughter and coheiress of Sir Abraham Hume, Bt., with whom he had three children:

- Lady Sophia Frances, (1811–1882) (allegedly a friend of Augustus Smith and a regular visitor to Tresco), married Lt-Col Christopher Tower. Mother of Amelia, Countess de Salis
- John Hume, Viscount Alford (1812–1851)
- Charles Henry (1813–1875)

Brownlow's wife died in 1814 and on 22 September 1818, he married Caroline Fludyer daughter of George Fludyer of Ayston, Rutland (and a granddaughter of Sir Samuel Fludyer, Bt). Brownlow and Caroline had four daughters:

- Lady Caroline Mary Cust, (1819–1898)
- Lady Amelia Cust, (1821–?)
- Lady Katherine Anne Cust, (1822–1885)
- Lady Elizabeth Cust, (1824–1824)

Caroline died in 1824 and Brownlow then married thirdly Lady Emma Sophia Edgcumbe, a daughter of the 2nd Earl of Mount Edgcumbe. Lord Brownlow did not have any children with his third wife.

As his eldest son had pre-deceased him in 1851, on his own death in 1853 his titles and estates passed to his grandson, John William Spencer Egerton-Cust.

Parliament of the United Kingdom
Preceded by Robert Curzon; Lord Edward Cavendish-Bentinck	Member of Parliament for Clitheroe; 1802–1807; With: Robert Curzon	Succeeded by Robert Curzon; James Gordon
Honorary titles
Preceded by The Duke of Ancaster and Kesteven	Lord Lieutenant of Lincolnshire; 1809–1852	Succeeded by Marquess of Granby
Vacant Title last held by The Earl Castleton	Vice-Admiral of Lincolnshire; 1809–1853	Succeeded by The Earl of Yarborough
Peerage of the United Kingdom
New title	Earl Brownlow; 1815–1853	Succeeded by John Egerton-Cust
Peerage of Great Britain
Preceded by Brownlow Cust	Baron Brownlow; 1807–1853	Succeeded by John Egerton-Cust
