= James Gordon (MP) =

English politician (1758–1822)

James Gordon (c. 1758–1822) was a British barrister, politician and plantation owner on Antigua and St Vincent.

== Life ==
He was the son of James Brebner and Anne Lavington (or Mary), born on Antigua. His father adopted the surname Gordon in 1768. His sister Mary married Sir William Abdy, 6th Baronet.

Gordon entered St John's College, Cambridge in 1775, at age 17; he had been educated at Winchester College, or possibly Harrow School. He entered Lincoln's Inn also in 1775, and was called to the bar there in 1780. He was elected Member of Parliament for Stockbridge in 1785, and for Truro in 1790, holding that seat to 1796. He was later Member of Parliament for Clitheroe, from 1808 to 1812.

James Gordon committed suicide at his London home on Hill Street, Mayfair, on 18 February 1822.

== Moor Place ==
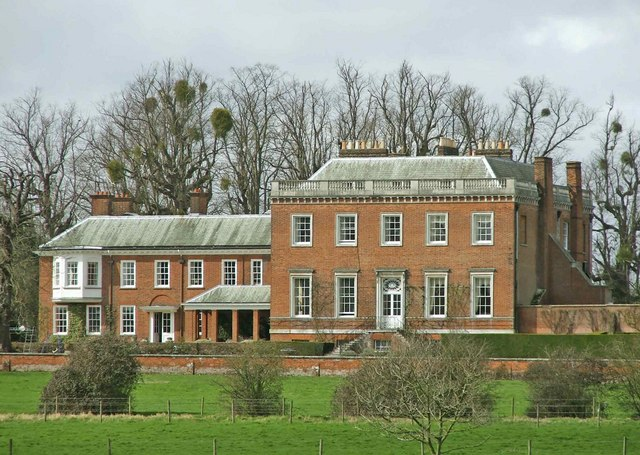
Moor Place, Much Hadham, 2006 photograph

Gordon inherited Moor Place at Much Hadham, Hertfordshire, when his father died in 1807; it was built by Robert Mitchell of Aberdeen for his father in 1777–9. The Moor Place estate had belonged to his great-uncle James Gordon (died 1768, of Antigua and Moor Place, 9th of Knockespock), whose will had caused his father to change name to James Brebner Gordon.

== Plantations ==
Gordon left extensive slave-run plantations to his son James Adam, in Antigua, St Vincent and St Kitts, and around 500 enslaved people.

== Family ==
Gordon married in 1789 Harriet or Harriot Whitbread, daughter of Samuel Whitbread (1720–1796) the brewer and politician. She inherited Stocks House in Hertfordshire, from her maternal grandfather William Hayton of Ivinghoe.

The couple's eldest son was James Adam Gordon (1791–1854), Member of Parliament for Tregony in the years before the Great Reform Act.
