= Cust (surname) =

Cust is an English surname. It may refer to:

- Cust baronets, a Baronetage of England and a Baronetage of the United Kingdom
- Albinia Wherry née Cust (1857–1929), writer, daughter of Robert Needham
- Aleen Cust (1868–1937), Irish veterinary surgeon
- Archer Cust (1896–1962), British civil servant and art historian
- Brownlow Cust, 1st Baron Brownlow (1744–1808), English Member of Parliament
- Charles Cust (1813–1875), British soldier and Conservative politician
- Edward Cust (1794–1878), British soldier, politician and courtier
- Edwards Cust (1804–1895), Archdeacon of Richmond from 1868 until 1894
- Harry Cust (1861–1917), English journalist, poet, and Member of Parliament
- Henry Cockayne Cust (1780–1861), Canon of Windsor from 1813 to 1861
- Jack Cust (born 1979), American baseball outfielder
- John Cust (footballer) (1874–1954), Scottish footballer
- Lionel Cust (1859–1929), English art historian and museum director
- Maria Cust (1862 or 1863 - 1958), English geographer, daughter of Robert Needham
- Peregrine Cust (disambiguation), multiple people
- Richard Cust (disambiguation), multiple people
- Robert Needham Cust (1821–1909), British colonial administrator and linguist, father of Albinia and Maria
- Sir John Cust, 3rd Baronet (1718–1770), British politician
- William Cust (1787–1845), British barrister and Member of Parliament

== See also ==
- Cust (disambiguation)
