= John Cust =

John Cust may refer to:

- Sir John Cust, 3rd Baronet (1718–1770), British politician, Speaker of the House of Commons
- John Cust, 1st Earl Brownlow (1779–1853), British politician and peer
- John Egerton, Viscount Alford (1812–1851), British politician (born John Hume Cust)
- John Cust (footballer) (1874–1954), Scottish footballer
