= Tomb of the Virgin Mary =

Tomb and church in Jerusalem

Church of the Sepulchre of Saint Mary
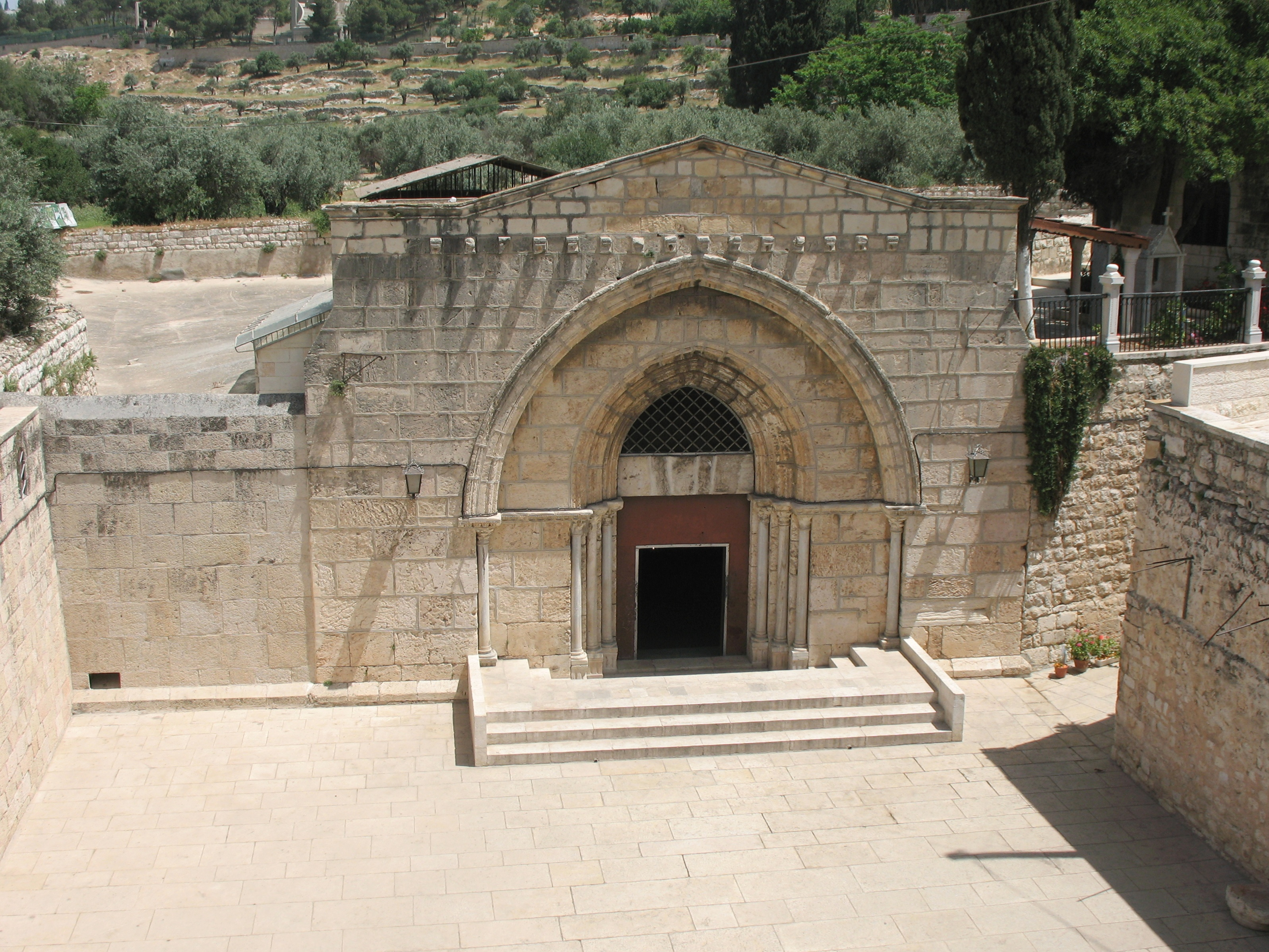
- Twelfth-century façade of Mary's Tomb

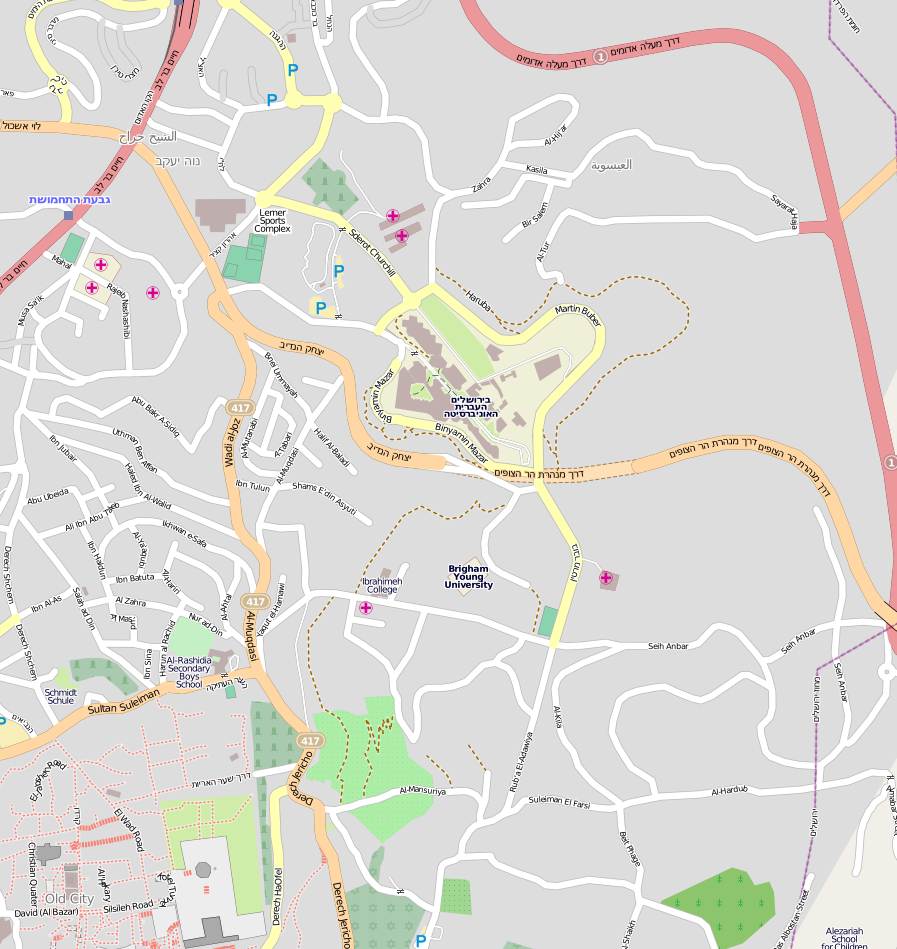
- Location within East Central Jerusalem Location within Jerusalem

Religion
- Affiliation: Christianity (Catholic, Armenian Orthodox, Greek Orthodox, Ethiopian Orthodox, Syriac Orthodox, Coptic Orthodox), Islam
- Rite: Latin, Byzantine, Alexandrian, Armenian, Syriac
- Ecclesiastical or organisational status: Active

Location
- Location: Mount of Olives, Kidron Valley, Jerusalem
- Municipality: Jerusalem
- Coordinates: 31°46′48″N 35°14′22″E

Architecture
- Type: Church, tomb
- Materials: Stone

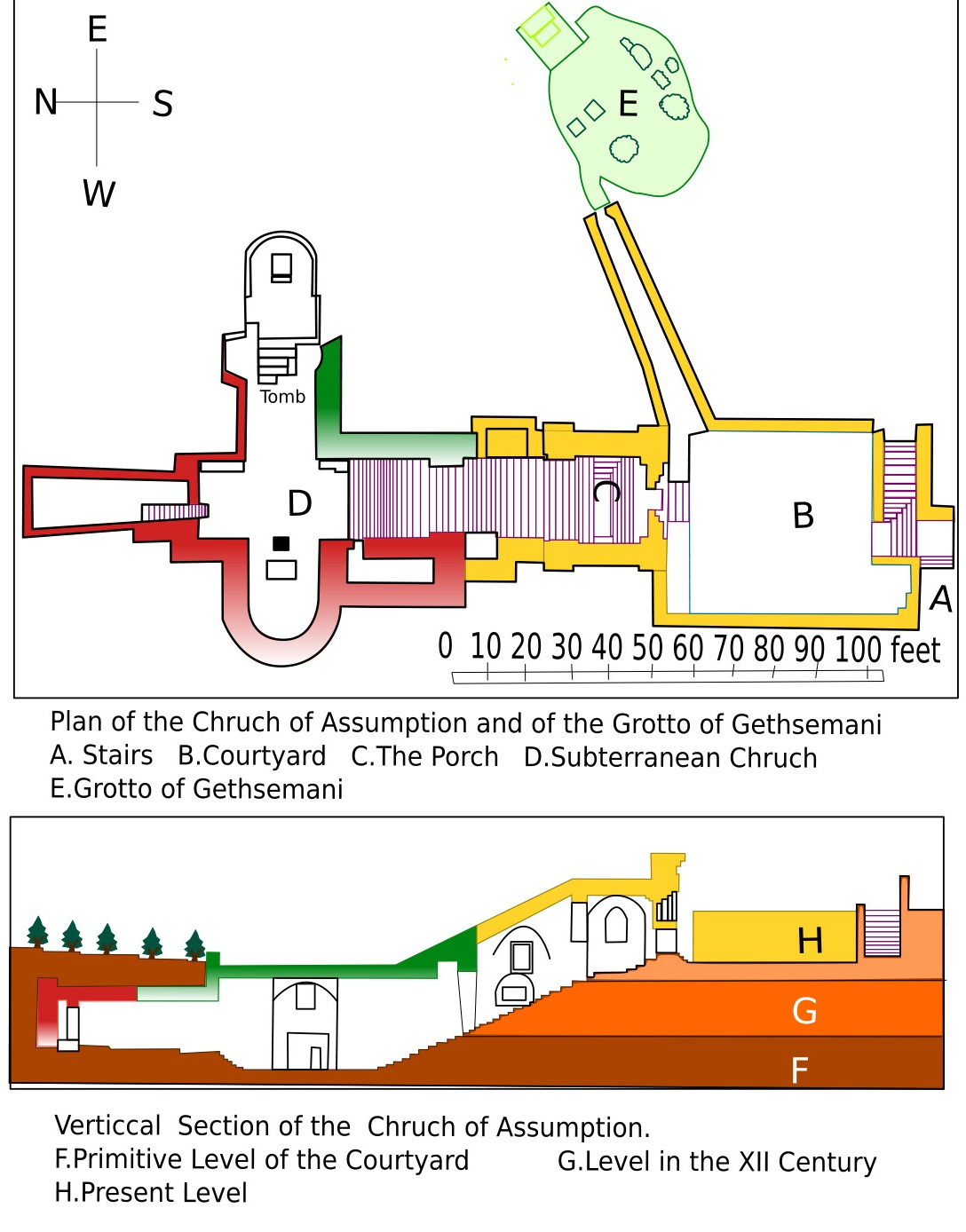
Plan and vertical cross-section of the site

Church of the Sepulchre of Saint Mary, also Tomb of the Virgin Mary (Hebrew: קבר מרים; Arabic: قبر السيدة العذراء مريم; Greek: Τάφος της Παναγίας; Armenian: Սուրբ Մարիամ Աստվածածնի գերեզման; Georgian: ღვთისმშობლის სამარხი) or the Church of the Assumption (Latin: Ecclesia Assumptionis), is a Christian church built around an ancient Judean rock-cut tomb in the Kidron Valley – at the foot of Mount of Olives, in East Jerusalem – believed by Christians to be the burial place of Mary, the mother of Jesus. The Status Quo, a 250-year-old understanding between religious communities, applies to the site.

== Christian tradition ==
The Sacred Tradition of Eastern Christianity teaches that the Virgin Mary died a natural death (the Dormition of the Theotokos, the falling asleep), like any human being; that her soul was received by Christ upon death; and that her body was resurrected on the third day after her repose, at which time she was taken up, soul and body, into heaven in anticipation of the general resurrection. Her tomb, according to this teaching, was found empty on the third day.

Roman Catholic teaching holds that Mary was "assumed" into heaven in bodily form, the Assumption; the question of whether or not Mary actually underwent physical death remains open in the Catholic view. On 25 June 1997 Pope John Paul II said that Mary experienced natural death prior to her assumption into Heaven.

A narrative known as the Euthymiaca Historia (written probably by Cyril of Scythopolis in the 5th century) relates how the Emperor Marcian and his wife, Pulcheria, requested the relics of the Virgin Mary from Juvenal, the Patriarch of Jerusalem, while he was attending the Council of Chalcedon (451). According to the account, Juvenal replied that, on the third day after her burial, Mary's tomb was discovered to be empty, only her shroud being preserved in the church of Gethsemane. In 452 the shroud was sent to Constantinople, where it was kept in the Church of Our Lady of Blachernae (Panagia Blacherniotissa).

According to other traditions, it was the Cincture of the Virgin Mary which was left behind in the tomb, or dropped by her during Assumption.

== History and archaeology ==
=== Roman-period cemetery ===
In 1972, Bellarmino Bagatti, a Franciscan friar and archaeologist, excavated the site and found evidence of an ancient cemetery dating to the 1st century; his findings have not yet been subject to peer review by the wider archaeological community, and the validity of his dating has not been fully assessed.

Bagatti interpreted the remains to indicate that the cemetery's initial structure consisted of three chambers (the actual tomb being the inner chamber of the whole complex), was adjudged in accordance with the customs of that period.

=== Byzantine- and Early Muslim-period structures ===
Later, the tomb interpreted by the local Christians to be that of Mary's was isolated from the rest of the necropolis, by cutting the surrounding rock face away from it. An edicule was built on the tomb.

A small upper church on an octagonal footing was built by Patriarch Juvenal (during Marcian's rule) over the location in the 5th century; this was destroyed in the Persian invasion of 614.

Alternatively, Jerome Murphy-O'Connor writes that a church is mentioned only in the late 6th century, and that – if indeed it was destroyed in 614 – it was rebuilt and was visited by Arculf (c. 670) and described as two-level and round.

During the following centuries the church was destroyed and rebuilt many times, but the crypt was left untouched, as for Muslims it is the burial place of the mother of prophet Isa (Jesus).

=== Crusader church and monastery ===
By 1130, during the Crusader Kingdom of Jerusalem, the church was rebuilt by the Benedictines, who installed a walled monastery, the Abbey of St. Mary of the Valley of Jehoshaphat; the church is sometimes mentioned as the Shrine of Our Lady of Josaphat (or Joshaphat). The monastic complex included three towers for protection, and was decorated with early Gothic columns and red-on-green frescoes.

The Crusader building from 1130 included an upper church built on the ruins of its predecessor, demolished in 1009 by Caliph al-Hakim, and a lower church, consisting of the crypt of the Byzantine church, and as additions built by the Crusaders, a southern entrance followed by a staircase.

=== Saladin (1187) and aftermath ===
The upper church was destroyed by Saladin in 1187, its masonry being used to repair the walls of Jerusalem. Saladin left the lower church intact, but removed all the Christian imagery from it.

In the second half of the 14th century Franciscan friars rebuilt the church once more.

The clergy of the Greek Orthodox Church had been the guardians of the Holy Places until the arrival of the Roman Catholic Crusaders in 1099, and in 1757 they tried to take back various Holy Land sites, including this one. As a result of that, the Franciscans, who had owned the church since 1363, were forced to leave. The Ottoman courts supported this state of affairs, which henceforth became known as the "status quo". Since then, the tomb has been owned by the Greek Orthodox Church and the Armenian Apostolic Church of Jerusalem, while the closeby grotto of Gethsemane remained in the possession of the Franciscans.

== The church ==
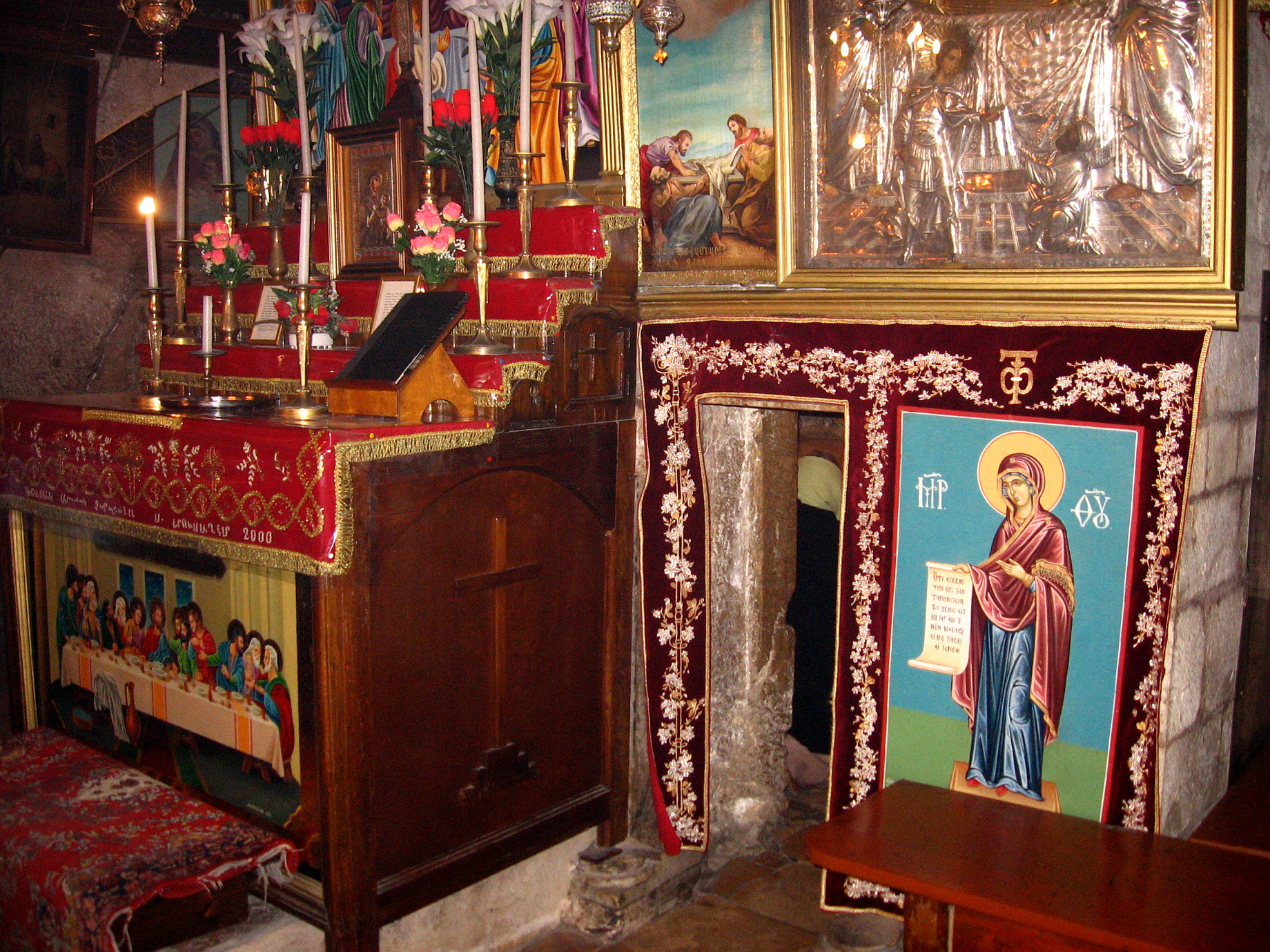
The rock-cut Tomb of Mary and its entrance, its front side covered in icons; eastern apse of the crypt

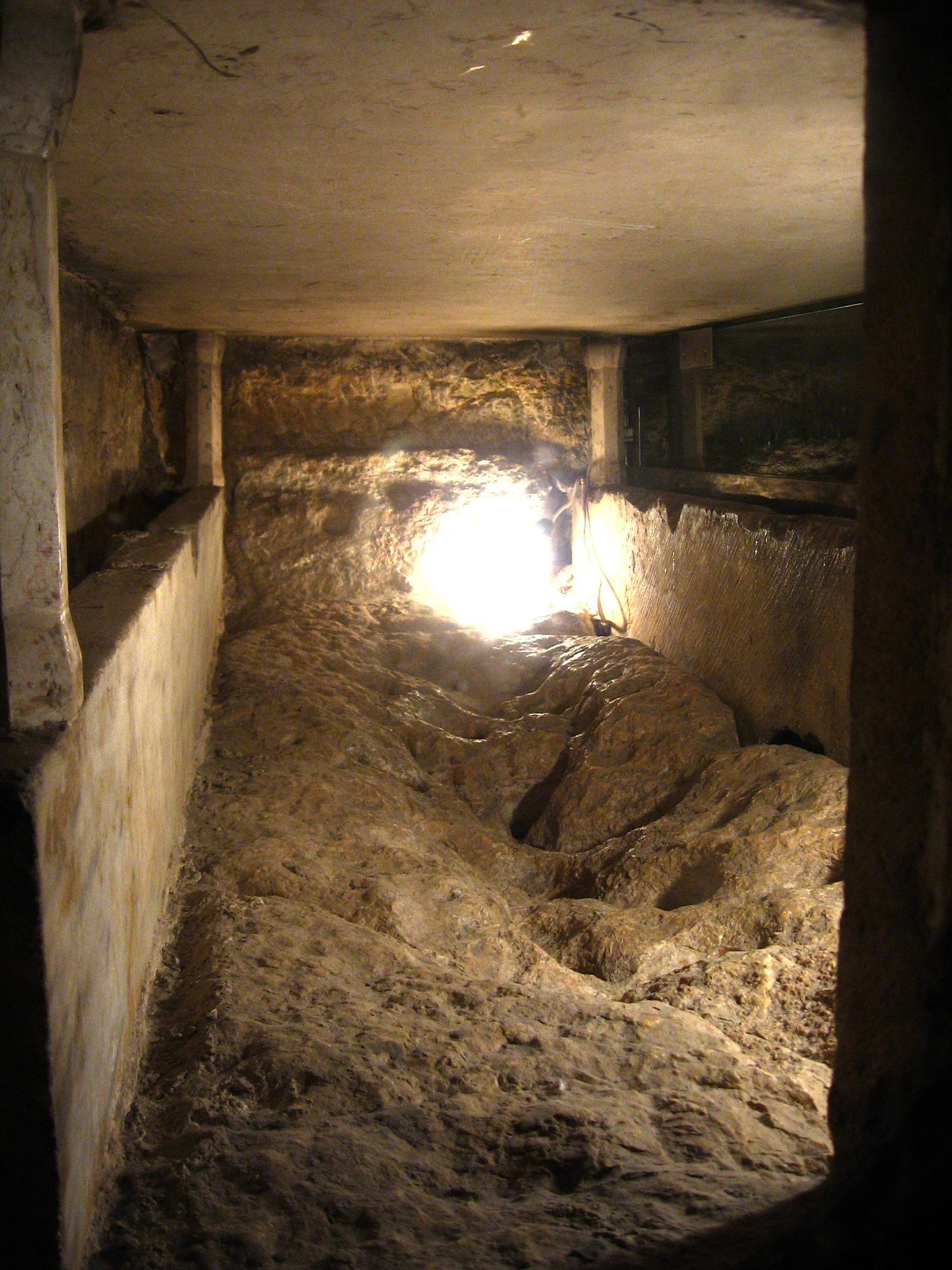
The stone bench on which Mary’s body was laid out, now encased in glass

Preceded by a walled courtyard to the south, the cruciform church shielding the tomb has been created in part by cutting through the rock and in part with masonry, and is entered by a wide descending staircase whose upper section dates from the 12th century. On the right side of the staircase (towards the east) there is the chapel of Mary's parents, Joachim and Anne, initially built to hold the tomb of Queen Melisende of Jerusalem, the daughter of Baldwin II, whose sarcophagus has been removed from there by the Greek Orthodox. On the left (towards the west) there is the chapel of Saint Joseph, Mary's husband, initially built as the tomb of two other female relatives of Baldwin II.

At the bottom of the staircase, on the eastern side of the church, there is the edicule that contains Mary's tomb. There are also altars of the Greeks and Armenians in the east apse. A niche south of the tomb is a mihrab indicating the direction of Mecca, installed when Muslims had joint rights to the church. Currently the Muslims have no more ownership rights to this site. On the western side there is a Syriac altar.

The Armenian Apostolic Church of Jerusalem and the Greek Orthodox Church of Jerusalem are in possession of the shrine. The Syriacs, the Copts, and the Ethiopians have minor rights.

=== "Panagia Ierosolymitissa" icon ===
Within the church is located a famous icon called Panagia Ierosolymitissa (All-holy Lady of Jerusalem) which, according to tradition, was miraculously created without human intervention.

== Authenticity ==
=== Ephesus as alternative ===
A legend, which was first mentioned by Epiphanius of Salamis in the 4th century AD, purported that Mary may have spent the last years of her life in Ephesus, Turkey. The Ephesians derived it from John's presence in the city, and Jesus’ instructions to John to take care of Mary after his death. Epiphanius, however, pointed out that although the Bible mentions John leaving for Asia, it makes no mention of Mary going with him. The Eastern Orthodox Church tradition believes that Virgin Mary lived in the vicinity of Ephesus, at Selçuk, where there is a place currently known as the House of the Virgin Mary and venerated by Catholics and Muslims, but argues that she only stayed there for a few years, even though there are accounts of her spending nine years until her death.

=== Pro: apocrypha ===
Although no information about the end of Mary's life or her burial are provided in the New Testament accounts, and many Christians believe that none exist in early apocrypha, some apocryphon are offered as supporting Mary's death (or other final fate). The Book of John about the Dormition of Mary, written in either the 1st, 3rd, 4th, or 7th century, places her tomb in Gethsemene, as does the 4th century Treatise about the passing of the Blessed Virgin Mary.

=== Pro: 4th- to 8th-century sources ===
The pilgrim Antoninus of Piacenza, writing of travels in 560–570 AD, mentions in that valley was "the basilica of the Blessed Mary, which they say was her house; in which is shown a sepulchre, from which they say that the Blessed Mary was taken up into heaven." Before as well as after the anonymous traveller from Piacenza, during the 4th to early 8th centuries, Saints Epiphanius of Salamis, Gregory of Tours, Isidore of Seville, Modest, Sophronius of Jerusalem, German of Constantinople, Andrew of Crete, and John of Damascus talk about the tomb being in Jerusalem, and bear witness that this tradition was accepted by all the Churches of East and West.

== Other claims ==
=== Christianity ===
Turkmen Keraites believe, according to a Nestorian tradition, that another tomb of the Virgin Mary is located in Mary, Turkmenistan – a town originally named Mari.

Another tradition exists among the Christians of Nineveh in northern Iraq, that the tomb of Mary is located near Erbil, linking the site to the direction of tilt of the former Great Mosque of al-Nuri minaret in Mosul.

=== Ahmadiyya ===
In Ahmadiyya, an Islamic messianic movement, it is believed that Mary was buried in the town of Murree, Pakistan, and her tomb is presently located in the shrine Mai Mari da Ashtan. The authenticity of these claims is not yet academically established and has not undergone any scholastic or academic research, nor canonical endorsement from the Holy See, nor anyone else.

== Gallery ==
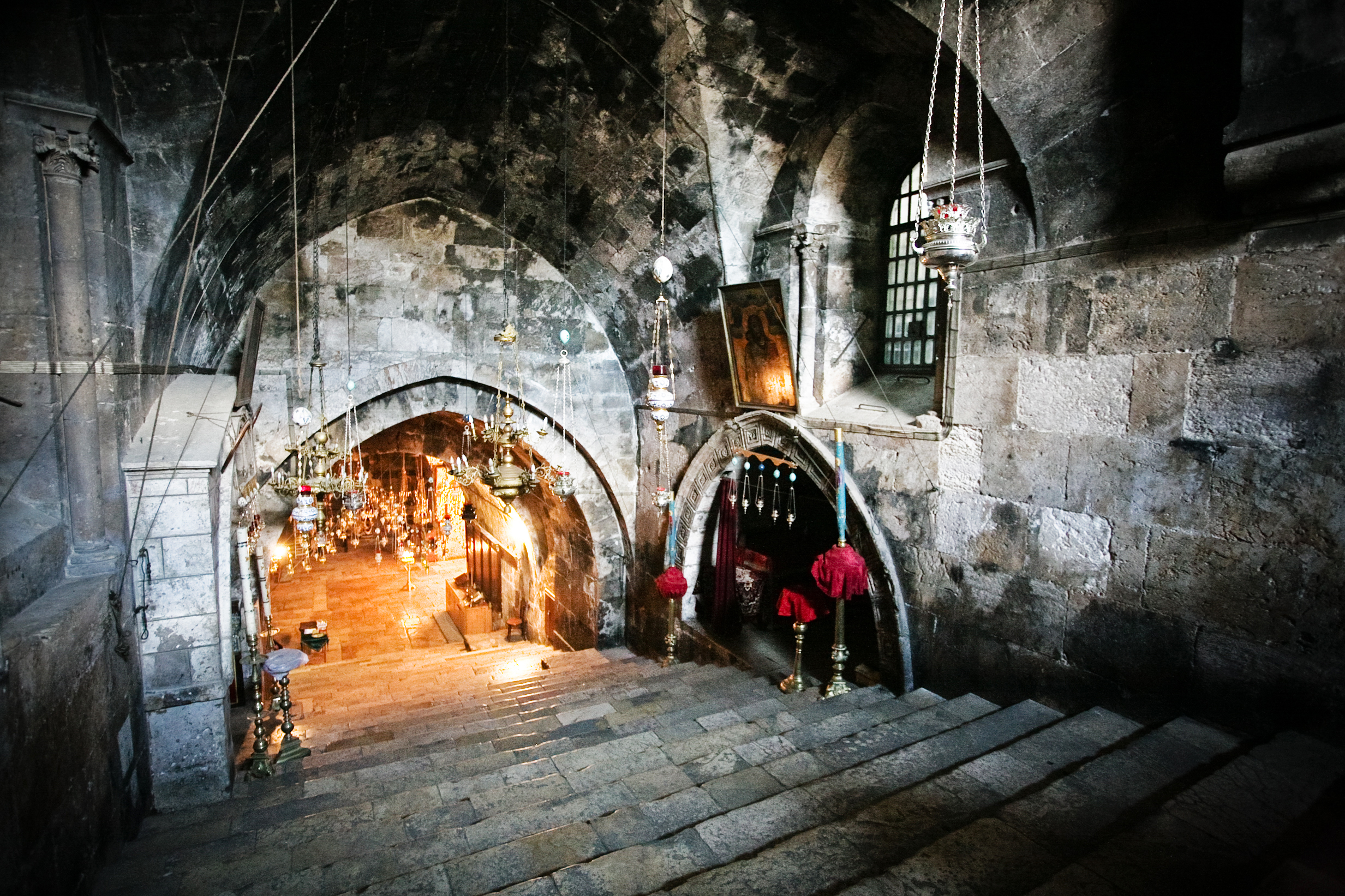
Staircase of 47 steps leading from the entrance down into crypt with the tomb

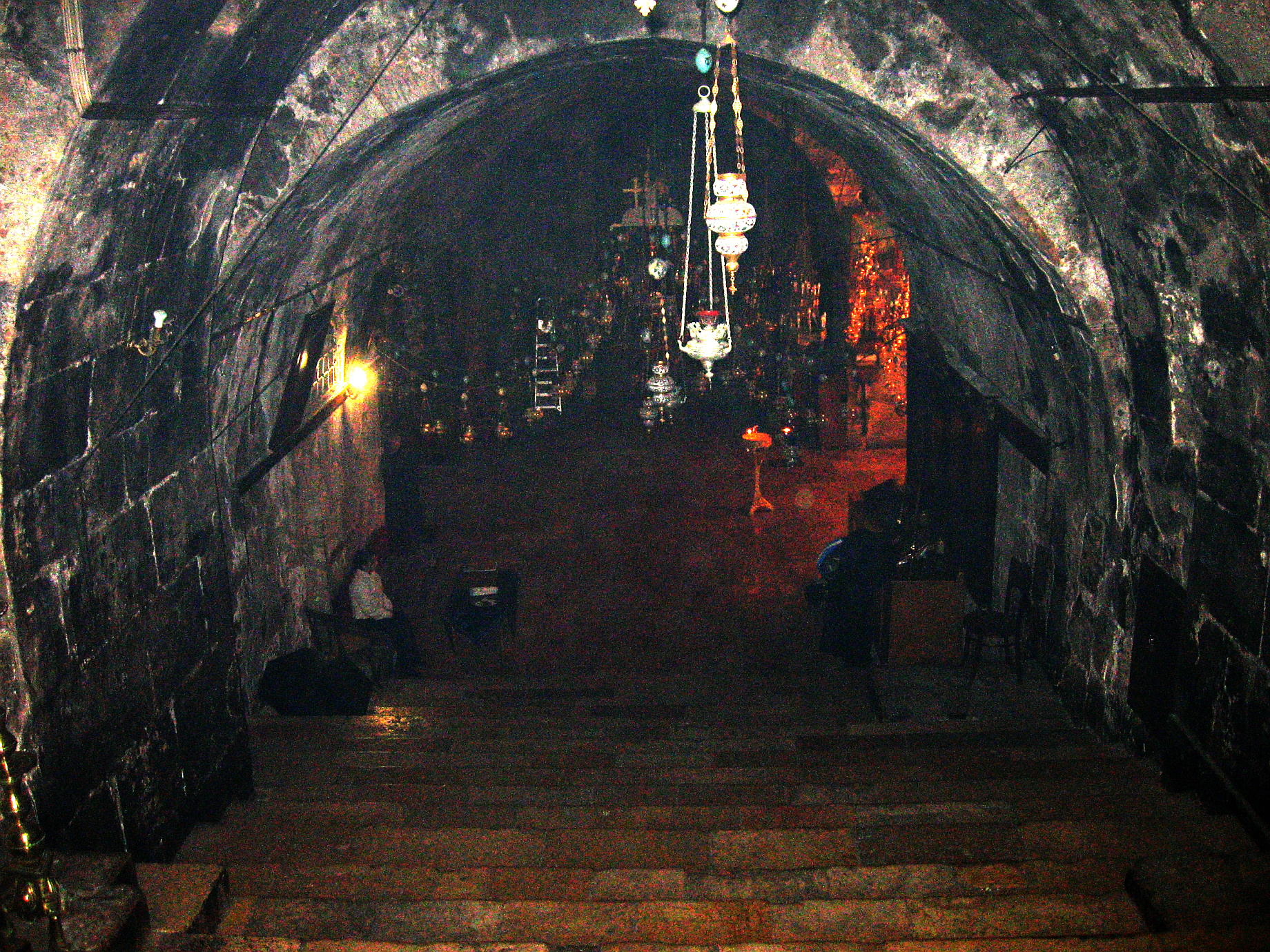
The entrance stairs, lower part

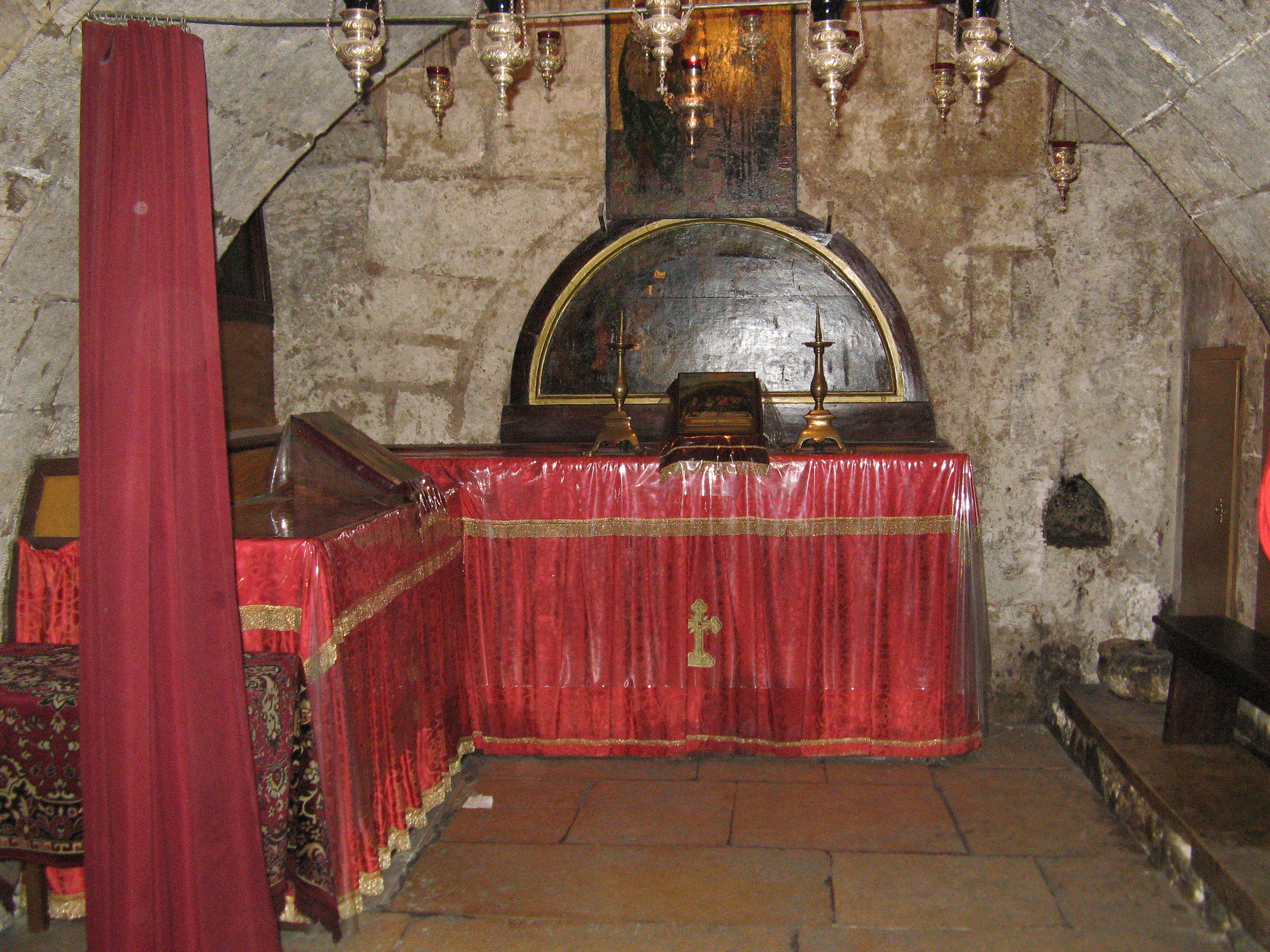
The Chapel of Saints Joachim and Anne, originally the tomb of Queen Melisende of Jerusalem

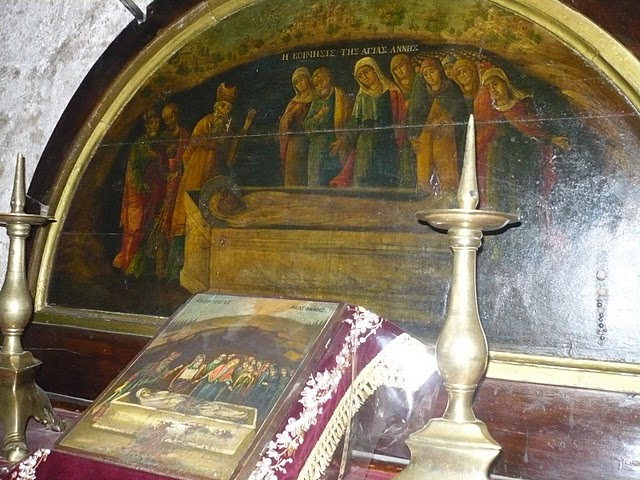
Icons in the Chapel of Saints Joachim and Anne

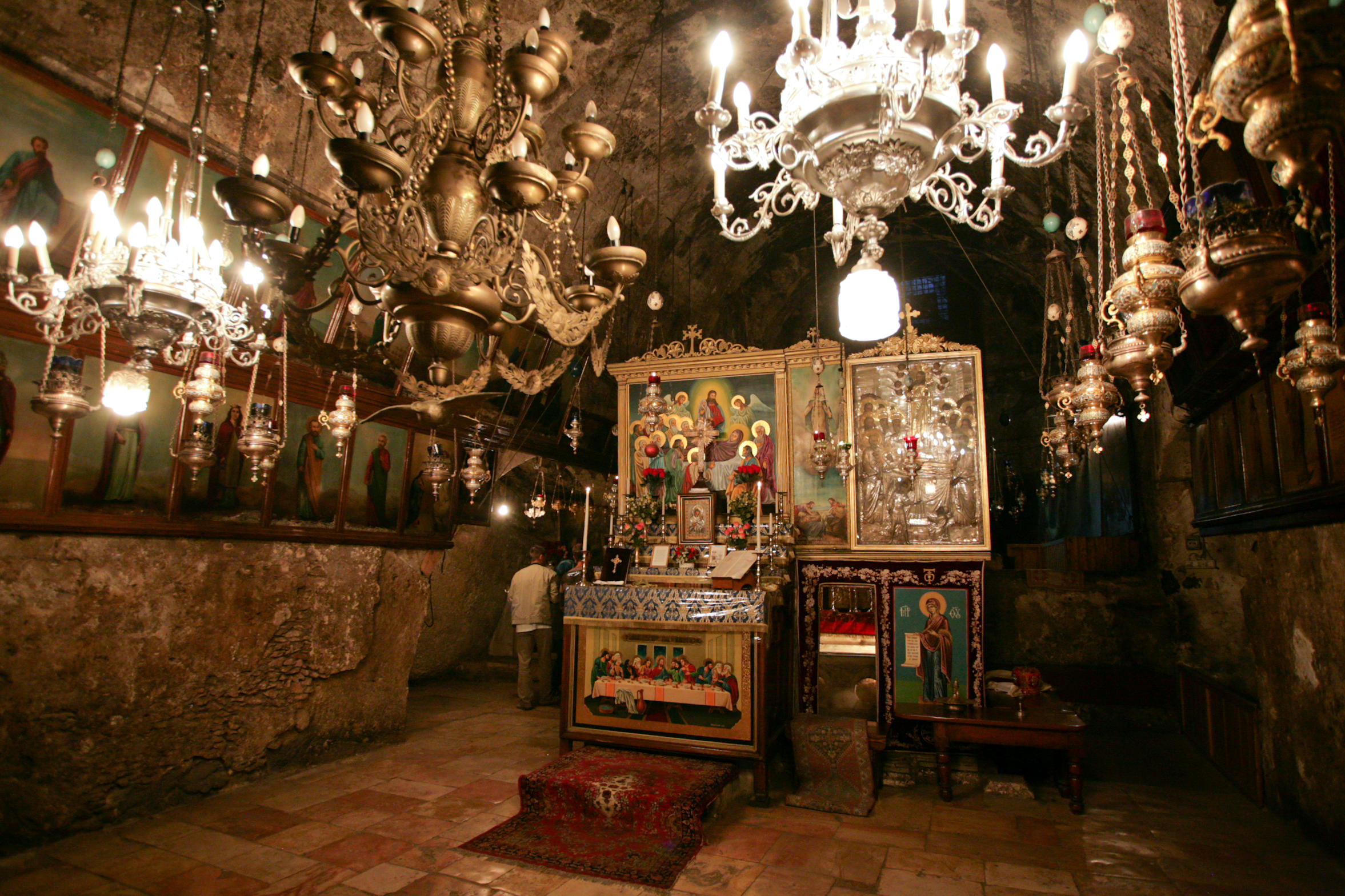
The Tomb of Mary: facade covered in icons and entrance door

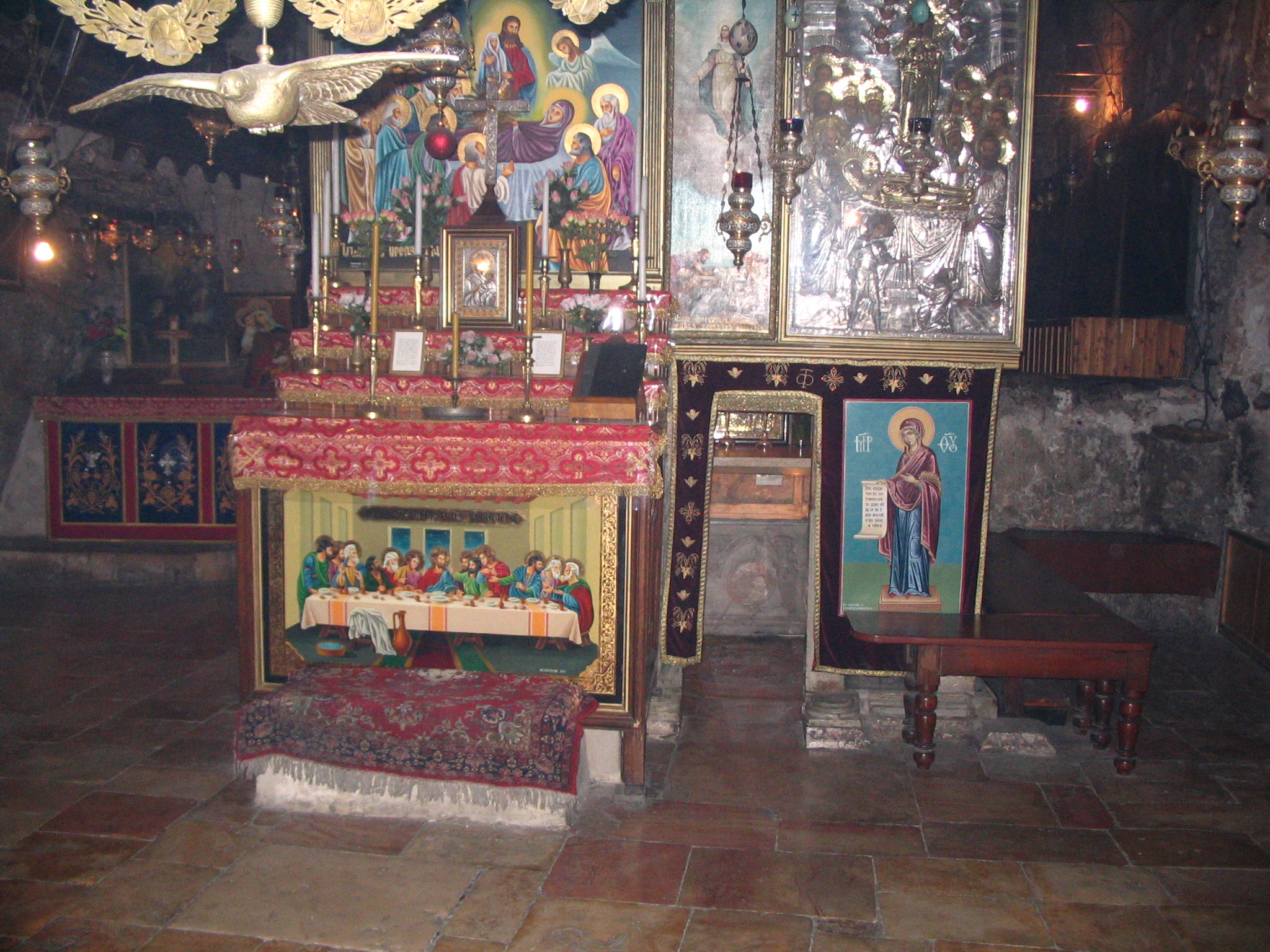
The Tomb of Mary: facade covered in icons and entrance door

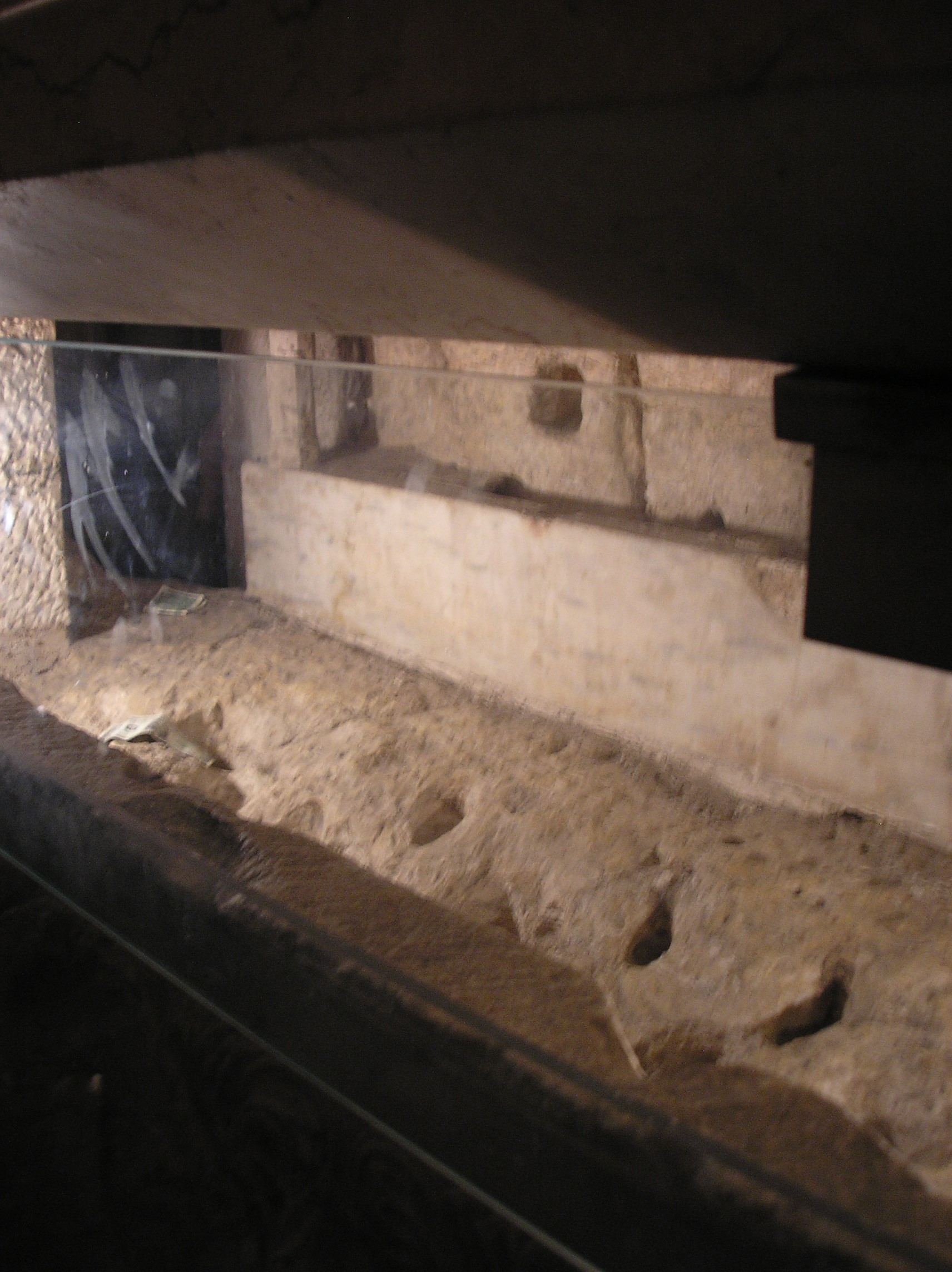
Inside the Tomb of Mary: the stone bench on which the Virgin's body was laid out

Crypt, western apse: icon of Mary and Christ

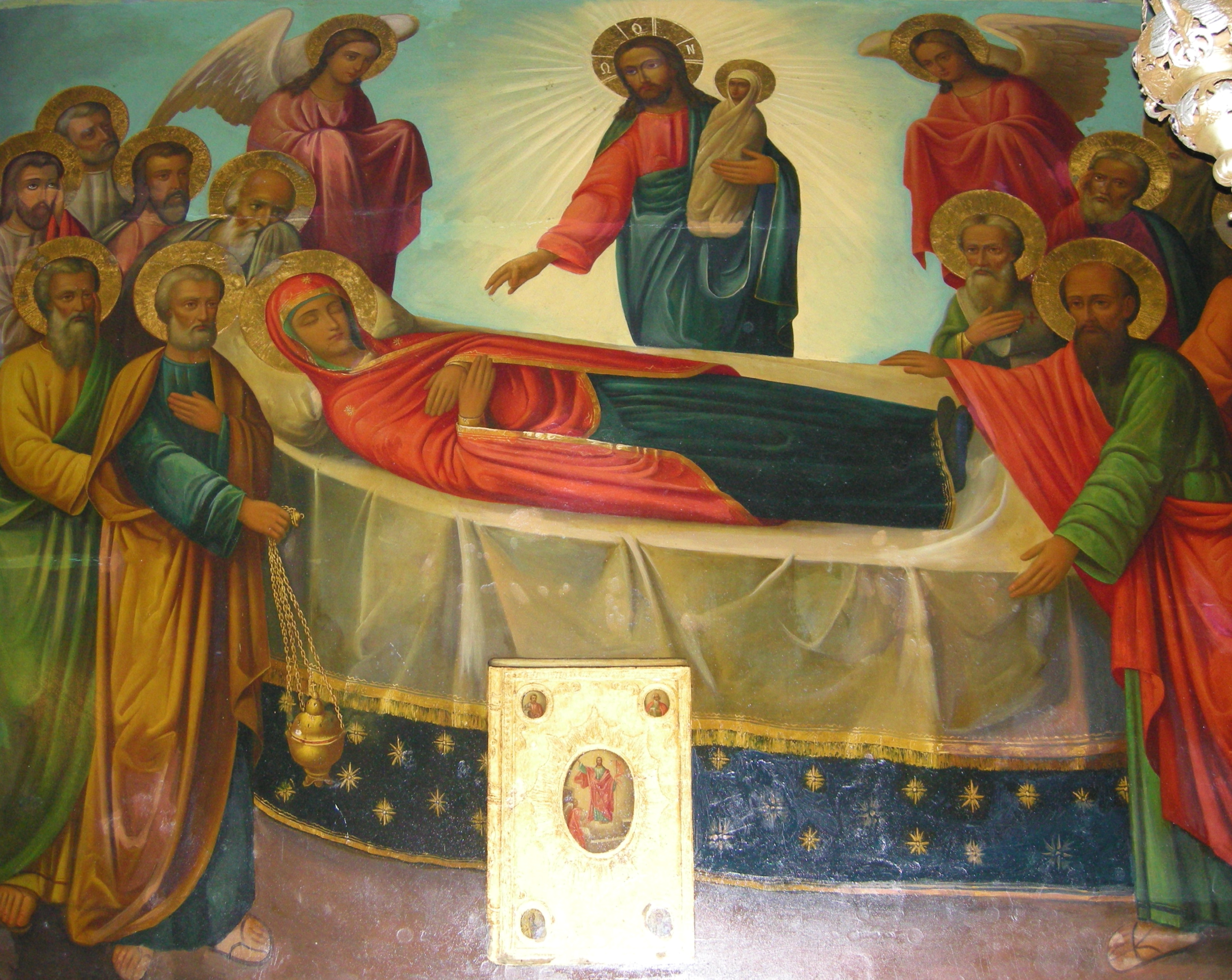
Icon of the Dormition of the Theotokos

== Festivities ==
=== Orthodox Dormition ===
Each 25 August (12 August according to the Julian calendar), the Orthodox icon of the Dormition of the Theotokos is carried in a procession from the Metochion of Gethsemane across from the entrance to the Church of the Holy Sepulchre, to the Tomb of Mary. Here it remains throughout the period around the Orthodox Day of Dormition (28 August), including the Lamentations of the Eve of the Dormition, until being taken back on 5 September (23 August Julian) in another procession.

== See also ==
- Panagia Ierosolymitissa (famous icon located in the Tomb of the Virgin Mary)
- Abbey of Saint Mary of the Valley of Jehosaphat
- Dormition of the Theotokos (Eastern Orthodox, Oriental Orthodox and Eastern Catholic theologies)
- Assumption of Mary (the same event differently seen by the Roman Catholic theology)
- House of the Virgin Mary, Catholic shrine on Mt. Koressos, Turkey

== Bibliography ==
- Adomnán (1895). Pilgrimage of Arculfus in the Holy Land (about the year A.D. 670). Palestine Pilgrims' Text Society. (about Arculf, p. 17)
- Antoninus of Piacenza (1890). Of the Holy Places Visited by Antoninus Martyr About the year A.D. 570. London: Palestine Pilgrims' Text Society.
- Clermont-Ganneau, C.S. (1899). [ARP] Archaeological Researches in Palestine 1873–1874, translated from the French by J. McFarlane. Vol. 1. London: Palestine Exploration Fund. (pp. 20–21)
- Cust, L.G.A. (1929). The Status Quo in the Holy Places. H.M.S.O. for the High Commissioner of the Government of Palestine.
- Olsson, Suzanne, Jesus in Kashmir The Lost Tomb (2019) www.rozabal.com|Investigation in to the alleged final resting place of Mary in Mari Ashtan, Pakistan, with photos and additional resource links.
- Fabri, F. (1896). Felix Fabri (circa 1480–1483 A.D.) vol I, part II. Palestine Pilgrims' Text Society. (pp. 464–469)
- Geary, Grattan (1878). Through Asiatic Turkey: narrative of a journey from Bombay to the Bosphorus. Vol. 2. London: Sampson Low, Marston, Searle & Rivington.
- Herbermann, C.G. (1901). Catholic Encyclopedia. Encyclopedia Press.
- Le Strange, G. (1890). Palestine Under the Moslems: A Description of Syria and the Holy Land from A.D. 650 to 1500. London: Committee of the Palestine Exploration Fund. OCLC 1004386. (pp. 210, 219)
- Maundrell, H. (1703). A Journey from Aleppo to Jerusalem: At Easter, A. D. 1697. Oxford: Printed at the Theatre. (p. 102)
- Moudjir ed-dyn (1876). Sauvaire (ed.). Histoire de Jérusalem et d'Hébron depuis Abraham jusqu'à la fin du XVe siècle de J.-C. : fragments de la Chronique de Moudjir-ed-dyn. (pp. 27, 33, 193)
- Murphy-O'Connor, J. (2008). The Holy Land: An Oxford Archaeological Guide from Earliest Times to 1700. Oxford Archaeological Guides. Oxford: Oxford University Press. pp. 148–150. ISBN 978-0-19-923666-4.
- Phokas, J. (1889). The Pilgrimage of Johannes Phocas in the Holy Land. Palestine Pilgrims' Text Society. (pp. 20–21)
- Pringle, D. (2007). The Churches of the Crusader Kingdom of Jerusalem: The city of Jerusalem. Vol. III. Cambridge University Press. ISBN 978-0-521-39038-5. (pp. 287–306)
- Roberts, A. (1886). The Ante-Nicene Fathers: The twelve patriarchs, Excerpts and epistles, The Clementina, Apocrypha, Decretals, Memoirs of Edessa and Syriac documents, Remains of the first ages: Volume 8 of The Ante-Nicene Fathers: Translations of the Writings of the Fathers Down to A.D. 325. C. Scribner's Sons.
- Vogüé, de, M. (1860). Les églises de la Terre Sainte.(pp. 305–313)
- Warren, C.; Conder, C.R. (1884). The Survey of Western Palestine: Jerusalem. London: Committee of the Palestine Exploration Fund. (pp. 40, 402)
