= Status Quo (Jerusalem and Bethlehem) =

Understanding among religious communities

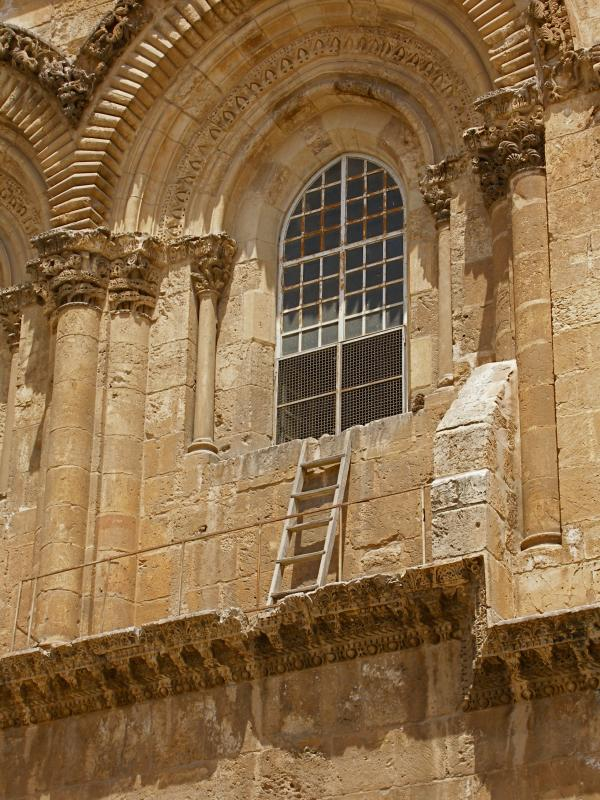
The Immovable Ladder in the Church of the Holy Sepulchre, pictured in 2009, has remained in the same location at least since the 18th century as a result of the Status Quo.

The Status Quo (Arabic: الوضع الراهن; Hebrew: סטטוס קוו) is an understanding among religious communities with respect to nine shared religious sites in Jerusalem and Bethlehem. Other holy places in Palestine were not deemed subject to the Status Quo, "because the authorities of one religion or community within a religion are in recognized or effective possession of them".

The status quo stemmed from a firman (decree) of Ottoman sultan Osman III in 1757 that preserved the division of ownership and responsibilities of various Christian holy places. Further firmans issued in 1852 and 1853 affirmed that no changes could be made without consensus from all six Christian communities; (Note: The Catholics, Greek Orthodox, Armenian, Syriac Orthodox, Coptic Christians and Ethiopians) these firmans received international recognition in Article 9 of the Treaty of Paris (1856). The term status quo was first used in regard to the Holy Places in the Treaty of Berlin (1878).

The 1929 summary prepared by Archer Cust, The Status Quo in the Holy Places, became the standard text on the subject, and the details were further formalized in the 1949 United Nations Conciliation Commission after the 1947–1949 Palestine war.

== History ==
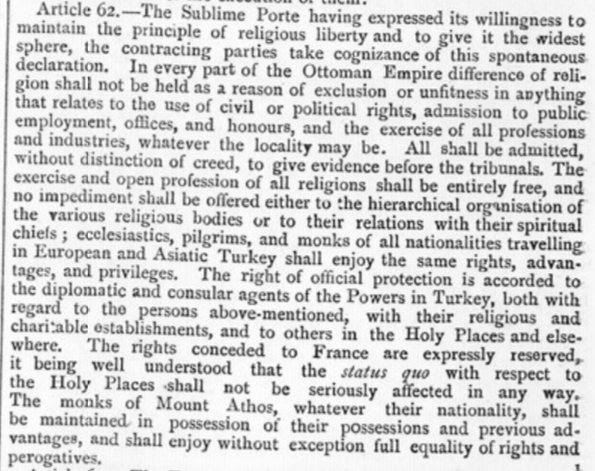
The Status Quo was formalized in international law in Article 62 of the Treaty of Berlin (1878): "The rights conceded to France are expressly reserved, it being well understood that the status quo with respect to the Holy Places shall not be seriously affected in any way."

Controlled by the Roman Empire and then, following its division, by the Eastern Roman (Byzantine) Empire, these eastern sites first became a point of contention in the centuries following 1054, when the Catholic Church and the Eastern Orthodox Church separated. Following the seizure of the Holy Land by knights from the West in the First Crusade, the Catholic church became the custodian of the churches in Jerusalem. With the defeat of the crusader states and the rise of the Ottoman Empire, control of the sites oscillated between the Catholic (Latin) and the Orthodox (Greek) churches, depending upon which could obtain a favorable firman (decree) from the Ottoman Sublime Porte at a particular time, often through outright bribery. Violent clashes were not uncommon. There was no agreement about this question, although it was discussed at the negotiations to the Treaty of Karlowitz between the Ottoman Empire and the Holy League in 1699.

During the Holy Week of 1757, Orthodox Christians reportedly took over some of the Franciscan-controlled church, possibly leading Sultan Osman III to write a 1757 decree forming the basis of the status quo. In the years preceding the Crimean War (1853–1856), Napoleon III of France pressured the sultan to invalidate the 1757 status quo in favor of the Catholic church, leading in part to Nicholas I of Russia declaring war in favor of the Orthodox church's rights. This resulted in 1852 and 1853 firmans by Sultan Abdülmecid I which received international recognition in Article 9 of the Treaty of Paris (1856) leaving the status quo intact. The existing territorial division was solidified amongst the communities, the treaty stating that "The actual status quo will be maintained and the Jerusalem shrines, whether owned in common or exclusively by the Greek, Latin, and Armenian communities, will all remain forever in their present state." Despite this declaration, there are no unanimous terms defining the status quo, sometimes causing contradictory differences of opinion.

Despite the arguments over who would control what aspects of these sites, the Status Quo has remained largely intact from the 18th century to the present.

The term status quo was first used in regards to the Holy Places in Article 62 of the Treaty of Berlin (1878). (Note: "The rights conceded to France are expressly reserved, it being well understood that the status quo with respect to the Holy Places shall not be seriously affected in any way.") A summary of the Status Quo prepared by L. G. A. Cust, a civil servant of the British Mandate, The Status Quo in the Holy Places, quickly became the standard text on the subject.

== Sites ==
1949 United Nations Conciliation Commission for Palestine Working Paper on the Holy Places

According to the United Nations Conciliation Commission, the Status Quo applies to nine sites in Jerusalem and Bethlehem, which Cust separates into three categories:

- Disputed between Christian denominations:
  - The Church of the Holy Sepulchre and its dependencies, Jerusalem
    - The Deir es-Sultan, on top of the Church of the Holy Sepulchre, Jerusalem
  - The Tomb of the Virgin Mary, Jerusalem
  - The Church of the Nativity, Bethlehem
  - The Chapel of the Milk Grotto, Bethlehem (no records exist)
  - The Chapel of the Shepherd's Field, Bethlehem (no records exist)
- Disputed between Christians and Muslims:
  - The Chapel of the Ascension, Jerusalem
- Disputed between Jews and Muslims:
  - The Western Wall, Jerusalem
  - Rachel's Tomb, Bethlehem

=== David's Tomb and Cenacle ===
David's Tomb and Cenacle were not part of the Status quo arrangement during the British Mandate for Palestine; it is nevertheless in a similar position, being disputed by the Catholics who have built the current structure, the Muslims (the Ottoman sultan confiscated it from the Franciscans), and Jewish and Israeli institutions, who took control of it in 1948.

== Immovable items ==
=== Immovable ladder ===
The so-called immovable ladder (Note: Hebrew: סולם הסטטוס קוו; sulam ha-status kvo 'the status quo ladder' Arabic: السُّلَّمُ الثَّابِتُ; as-sullamu ṯ-ṯābitu 'the stationary ladder') under the window of the Church of the Holy Sepulchre, made of Lebanon cedar wood, was in place by 1728 and has apparently remained there since the 1757 status quo was established. The ladder is referred to as immovable due to the agreement of the Status Quo that no cleric of the six Churches may move, rearrange, or alter any property without the consent of the other five orders.

=== Immovable washing vessels ===
The Church of the Tomb of Mary has also been historically used by Muslims. The mihrab, a niche indicating the direction of Mecca, is currently boarded up. The two old bronze vessels once used by Muslims for ritual washing and the drainage opening underneath them are not being used anymore, but are nevertheless kept in their dedicated place.

== See also ==
- Church of the Holy Sepulchre § Status Quo
- Church of the Nativity § Property and administration
- David's Tomb, not subject to the status quo, but of its own Muslim waqf
- Fischer-Chauvel Agreement
- French national domain in the Holy Land
- Règlement organique (Mount Lebanon)
- Simultaneum
- Status quo (Israel)
- Hashemite custodianship of Jerusalem holy sites
- Temple Mount entry restrictions
