= Mujir al-Din =

Jerusalemite chronicler (1456–1522)

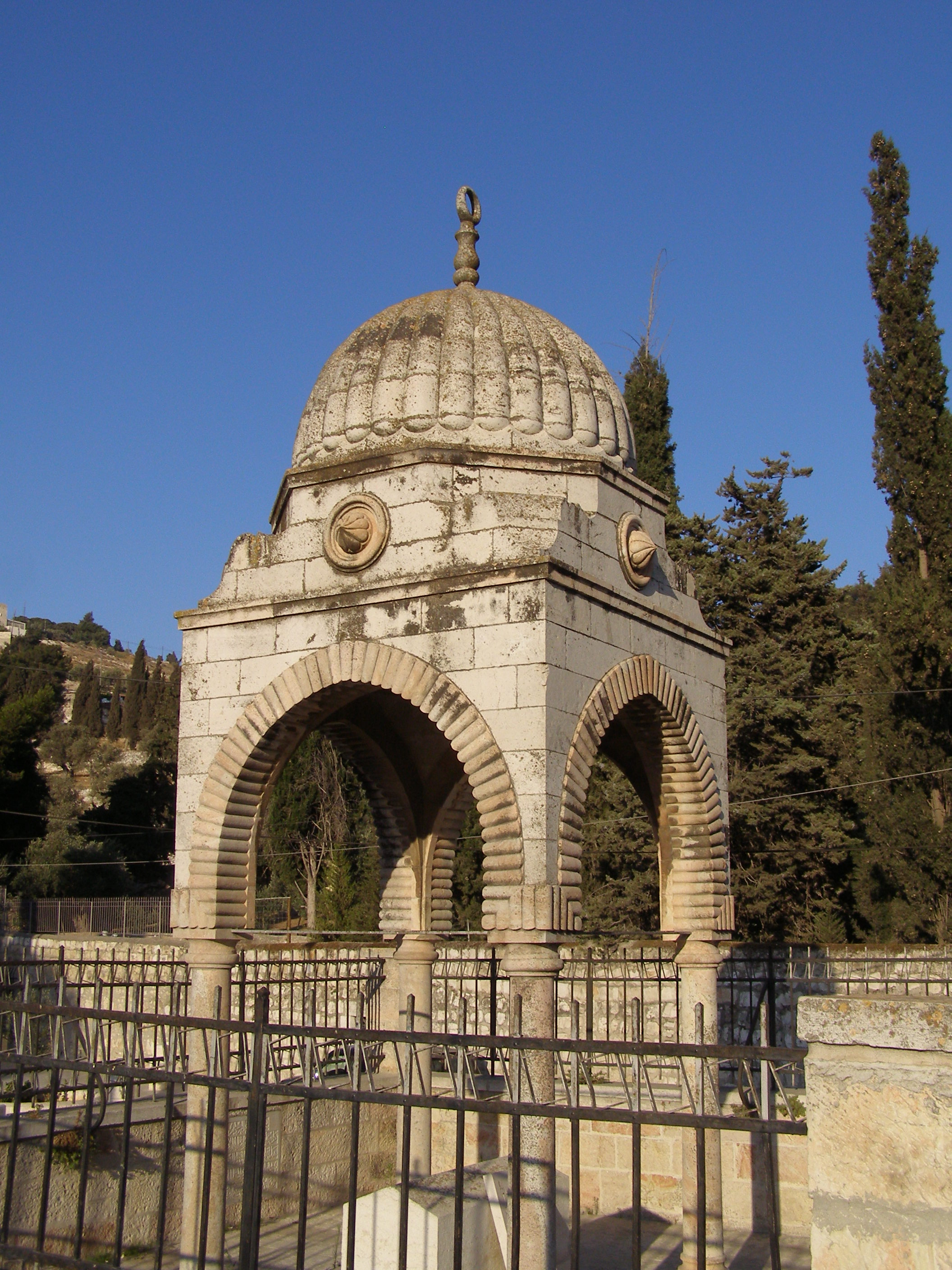
- Grave of Mujir al-Din, at the base of the Mount of Olives, Jerusalem.
- Born: 1456 CE; Jerusalem, Mamluk Sultanate
- Died: 1522 CE
- Occupations: Historian, Qadi

Academic work
- Era: Medieval Islamic period
- Main interests: History of Jerusalem and Hebron
- Notable works: al-Uns al-Jalil bi-tarikh al-Quds wal-Khalil (The Glorious History of Jerusalem and Hebron)

Mujīr al-Dīn al-ʿUlaymī (Arabic: مجير الدين العليمي; 1456–1522), often simply Mujir al-Din, was a Jerusalemite qadi and historian whose principal work chronicled the history of Jerusalem and Hebron in the Middle Ages. Entitled al-Uns al-Jalil bi-tarikh al-Quds wal-Khalil ("The glorious history of Jerusalem and Hebron") (c. 1495), it is considered to be invaluable, constituting "the most comprehensive and detailed source for the history of Jerusalem" written in its time.

== Name and background ==
Commonly known simply as Mujir al-Din or the Ibn Quttainah, he was born 'Abd al-Rahman ibn Muhammad al-'Ulaymi (Arabic: مجير الدين عبدالرحمن الحنبلي العليمي الشهير بأبن قطينه) during the period of Mamluk rule over Palestine into a family of notables native to the city of Jerusalem., Mujir al-Din was a Jerusalemite, though his family originally hailed from Ramla.

== Education ==
Mujir al-Din's father, Muhammad ibn 'Adb al-Rahman, was a scholar, and he instructed his son in the religious sciences. His formal education began early, and by the age of six, Mujir al-Din was successfully tested on his knowledge of Arabic grammar by another of his instructors, Taqi al-Din al-Qarqashandi, a Shafi'i sheikh, with whom he also studied the hadiths. At ten years old, he studied Quranic recitation with a Hanafi faqih (one who has received the Islamic equivalent of a Master of Law).

He attended Islamic jurisprudence classes given by Kamal al-Din al-Maqdisi, a prominent Shafi'i scholar and qadi, at al-Madrasa as-Salahiyya, the most prestigious college in the city, and at Al-Aqsa Mosque compound.^{[i]} Al-Maqdisi granted Mujir al-Din an ijaza when he was thirteen years old. In his youth in Jerusalem, he also studied hadith with two other Hanafi scholars (ibn Qamuwwa, a faqih, and the sheikh Shams al-Din al-Ghazzi al-Maqdisi), studying grammar and Hanbali fiqh with a Maliki scholar (the chief judge Nur al-Din al-Misri). When he was approximately eighteen years old, he left for Cairo, where he pursued his studies under the tutelage of Muhammad al-Sa'di, a qadi, for about ten years, returning to Jerusalem in 1484.

== Career ==
=== Public servant ===
Extensive knowledge of Arabic, Hanbali jurisprudence, and Islamic theology, as well as his hailing from highly regarded and well-connected family, led to Mujir al-Din's procuring important posts as a public servant. He was appointed the qadi of Ramla in 1484, and the chief Hanbali qadi of Jerusalem in 1486, holding this position for almost three decades until completing his service in 1516.

=== Writings ===
Mujir al-Din's writings included two volumes of Quranic exegesis, a biographical dictionary of Hanbali scholars, a general history from the time of Adam through to the Middle Ages, and a work on "The glorious history of Jerusalem and Hebron". The central focus of the latter book, despite its title, is the history of Jerusalem. Though many books had been written by other Arab and Muslim authors on the virtues of Jerusalem, including about 30 composed during the Mamluk period alone, none of these set out to provide a comprehensive history of the city, making Mujir al-Din's work unique in both scope and design.

The book is divided into four parts. The first outlines the history of Jerusalem, and to a lesser degree Hebron, from the time of Adam to the end of the 13th century, incorporating both political developments and events of importance to Islamic and pre-Islamic monotheistic traditions. The second part provides a physical description of shrines and landmarks in Hebron and Jerusalem, with a focus on Muslim sites. Biographies of the various governors of Jerusalem and Hebron in the Ayyubid and Mamluk periods, as well as those of notable Mamluk figures who undertook special works in these cities are provided in part three. The fourth part concerns itself with the history of Jerusalem during Mujir al-Din's own lifetime, under the rule of Mamluk Sultan Qait Bay. Composed in Jerusalem, Mujir al-Din alternates in referring to his place of residence as Filastin ("Palestine") and al-Ard al-Muqaddasa ("the Holy Land")., Mujir al-Din al-'Ulaymi, along with other prominent Palestinian Muslim scholars, jurists, and writers, referred to Palestine as "our country, Palestine" (bilādunā Filasṭīn), indicating that a territorial conception of Palestine was present.

== Influence ==
Mujir al-Din's writings are quoted extensively in the works of 19th century Orientalists and 20th and 21st century scholars alike. It is particularly valuable for what it reveals about the topography and social life of 15th century Jerusalem. A number of copies of manuscripts of al-Uns al-Jalil are kept in libraries in Paris, London and Vienna. El Wahby, a Cairo-based publishing house printed his work in full. A French translation of excerpts of his work with a foreword by Henry Sauvaire was published under the title, Histoire de Jérusalem et d'Hébron depuis Abraham jusqu'à la fin du XVe siècle de J.-C. : fragments de la Chronique de Moudjir-ed-dyn (1876). This compilation was made up of excerpts of his work translated from a manuscript procured in Jerusalem and from the Egyptian edition.

Translated excerpts of al-Uns al Jalil can be found in the work of Joseph Toussaint Reinaud and Joseph von Hammer-Purgstall. Guy Le Strange references the work of Mujir al-Din throughout his book Palestine Under the Moslems: A Description of Syria and the Holy Land from A.D. 650 to 1500 (1890), drawing upon his descriptions of various monuments to determine their state, appearance, and measurements at his time of writing.

== Death and tomb in Jerusalem ==
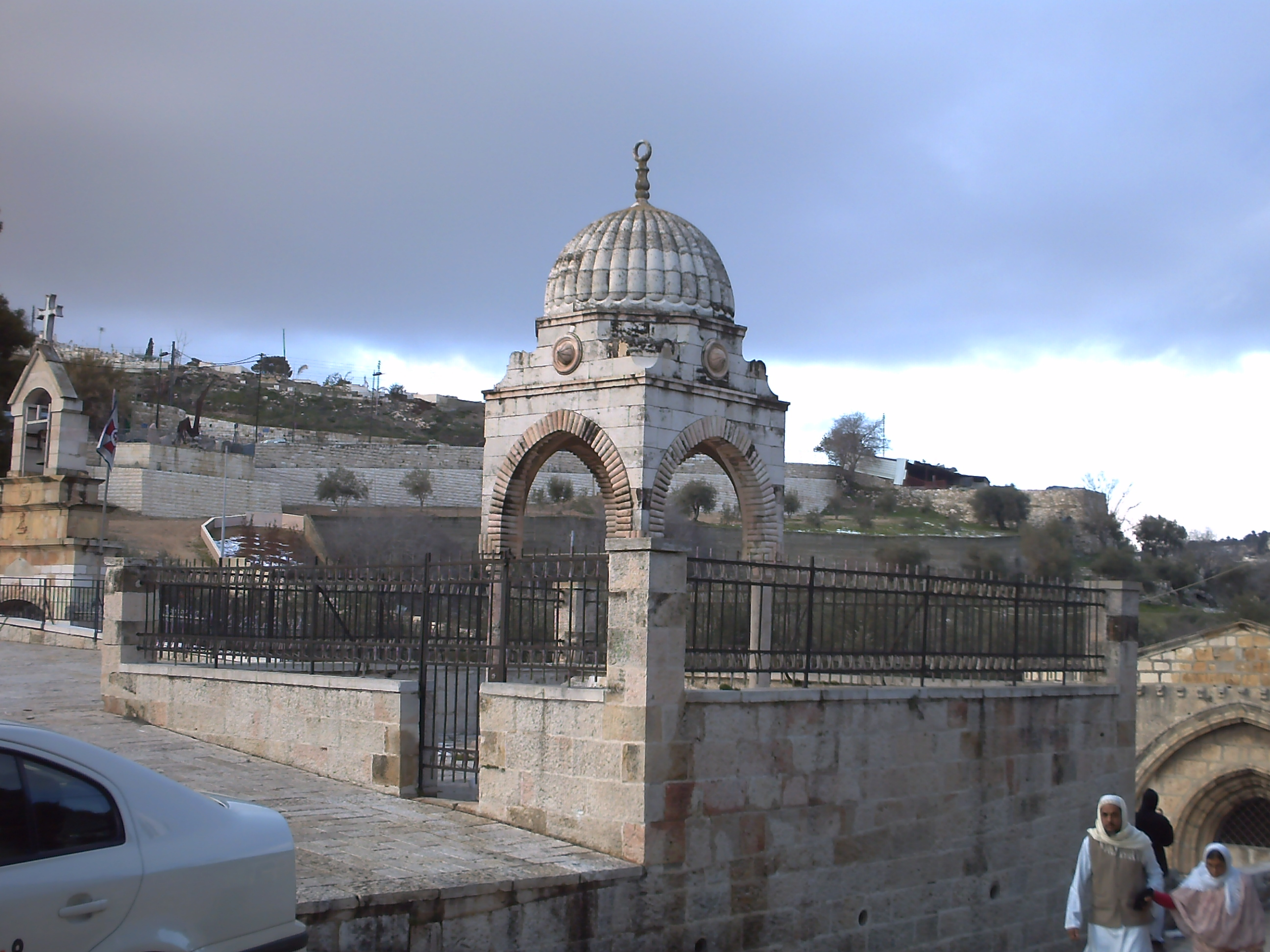
The tomb of Mujir ad-Din with the Tomb of Mary (right margin)

Mujir al-Din died in 1522. He was buried at the base of the Mount of Olives just outside the walls of the Old City, a little to the north of the Church of Gethsemane and right in front of the Tomb of Mary. His tomb, with its open four-columned structure covered by a dome, lies next to the sidewalk on the main road and there are steps leading down from it on both sides to the Tomb of the Virgin.

A street in the Sheikh Jarrah neighborhood in East Jerusalem is named after him

== Memorial shrine in Nablus ==
There is also a shrine in Nablus dedicated to the memory of Mujir Al-Din.

== Descendants ==
It is documented that members of the Jerusalemite family of Quttainah are the descendants of Mujir al-Din al-Hanbali. On a Palestinian genealogy website, they explain that the nickname Quttainah (meaning "dried fig") was given to al-Hanbali family some 300 years ago due to their use of dried figs to cover gold they were trading in within Palestine from road robbers. The Quttainah family continues to own numerous properties in and around the Old City, including waqf properties. Since the 1948 Palestinian expulsion and flight, some members of the family live in the Palestinian diaspora, in other Middle Eastern countries and the Persian Gulf region.

== Footnotes ==
- ^iIn Mujir al-Din's time, Al-Aqsa Mosque referred to the whole mosque compound (today also referred to as the Haram al-Sharif). The southernmost building in that compound, today known as Al-Aqsa Mosque, is called in Mujir al-Din's writings Al-Jami' Al-Kabir Al-Qibliyy ("The Grand Southern Friday-Mosque").

== Bibliography ==
- Donzel, va, E. J. (1994). E. J. van Donzel (ed.). Islamic desk reference (Illustrated ed.). Brill. p. 291. ISBN 978-90-04-09738-4. "mujir al-din ulaymi arab historian."
- Edbury, Peter W.; Phillips, Jonathan P. (2003). Peter W. Edbury; Jonathan P. Phillips (eds.). The experience of crusading, Volume 1. Cambridge University Press. ISBN 978-0-521-78151-0.
- Elad, Amikam (1995). Medieval Jerusalem and Islamic worship: holy places, ceremonies, pilgrimage (2nd, illustrated ed.). Brill. ISBN 978-90-04-10010-7.
- Khalidi, R. (1998). Palestinian Identity: The Construction of Modern National Consciousness. Columbia University Press. p. 216. ISBN 978-0-231-10515-6. "mujir al-din ulaymi."
- Le Strange, G. (1890). Palestine Under the Moslems: A Description of Syria and the Holy Land from A.D. 650 to 1500. Committee of the Palestine Exploration Fund., London, (p.12)
- Little, Donald P. (April–June 1995). "Mujīr al-Dīn al-'Ulaymī's Vision of Jerusalem in the Ninth/Fifteenth Century". Journal of the American Oriental Society. 115 (2). American Oriental Society: 237–247. doi:10.2307/604667. JSTOR 604667.
- Gerber, Haim (Fall 2003). "Zionism, Orientalism, and the Palestinians". Journal of Palestine Studies. 33 (1): 23–41. doi:10.1525/jps.2003.33.1.23. Archived from the original on 2012-02-26.
- Murphy-O'Connor, J. (2008). The Holy Land: an Oxford archaeological guide from earliest times to 1700 (5th, illustrated ed.). Oxford University Press US. ISBN 978-0-19-923666-4.
- Moudjir ed-dyn (1876). Sauvaire (ed.). Histoire de Jérusalem et d'Hébron depuis Abraham jusqu'à la fin du XVe siècle de J.-C. : fragments de la Chronique de Moudjir-ed-dyn.
  - Alt: Moudjir ed-dyn (1876). Sauvaire (ed.). Histoire de Jérusalem et d'Hébron depuis Abraham jusqu'à la fin du XVe siècle de J.-C. : fragments de la Chronique de Moudjir-ed-dyn.
- Al-Hanbali, Mujir al-Din (1973). Al-Uns al-Jalil fi Tarikh al-Quds wa al-Khalil [The Significant Ambiance in the History of Jerusalem and Hebron]. Amman.
- Ring, Trudy; Salkin, Robert M.; La Boda, Sharon (1996). Trudy Ring; Robert M. Salkin; Sharon La Boda (eds.). International Dictionary of Historic Places: Middle East and Africa (Illustrated, annotated ed.). Taylor & Francis. ISBN 978-1-884964-03-9.
