= Maria Cust =

English geographer (1862/3-1958

Maria Eleanor Vere Cust FRGS (30 Sept 1862 – 2 Jan 1958) was an English geographer and missionary who was the first woman to become a Fellow of the Royal Geographical Society.

Cust was born on 30 Sept 1862 in Bengal, India. Her father was Robert Needham Cust (1821-1909), an orientalist, colonial administrator, and judge in India. Her mother was Maria Adelaide née Hobart (died 1864), daughter of Henry Lewis Hobart, Dean of Windsor. Her elder sister was nurse and writer Albinia Lucy Wherry (1857-1929).

Cust "acted for many years as her father's secretary, materially aiding his studies", and also worked as a medical missionary in India. Her books of poetry, Songs of sunshine and shadow and The annunciation and other poems were privately printed in 1903 and 1904 respectively, and Lucem Sequor and other poems, described as "indifferent verse ...[showing] the influence of her religion and the East", was published by in 1909. She is said to have produced "passable" translations of writers including Heinrich Heine, Joseph Freiherr von Eichendorff, and Victor Hugo.

The Royal Geographical Society did not admit women to its membership on equal terms with men until 1913, and in 1847 had agreed that it was "not deemed expedient at present" to admit women as members. Cust's father Robert proposed a motion in 1892 which led to the election of fifteen "well qualified ladies" to fellowship on 28 November 1892. They were elected in alphabetical order, and because Isabella Bird Bishop was at the time in Tibet, Maria Cust, as the next in sequence, was the first woman to be elected as a fellow.

She died on 5 Mar 1958 in Hertford, England, aged 95.

== Selected publications ==
- The family-bookcase of Belton House, Lincolnshire / Compiled by Robert Needham Cust, ... with the assistance of his daughter, Maria Eleanor Vere Cust (1903)
- Songs of sunshine and shadow (1903, privately printed)
- The annunciation and other poems (1904, privately printed)
- Lucem Sequor and other poems (1909, Kegan Paul, Trench, TrUbner & Co.)
