= Panagia Ierosolymitissa =

Icon in the Tomb of Mary

Coordinates: 31°46′48″N 35°14′22″E

- Greek: Παναγία Ιεροσολυμίτισσα, English: All-Holy Lady of Jerusalem
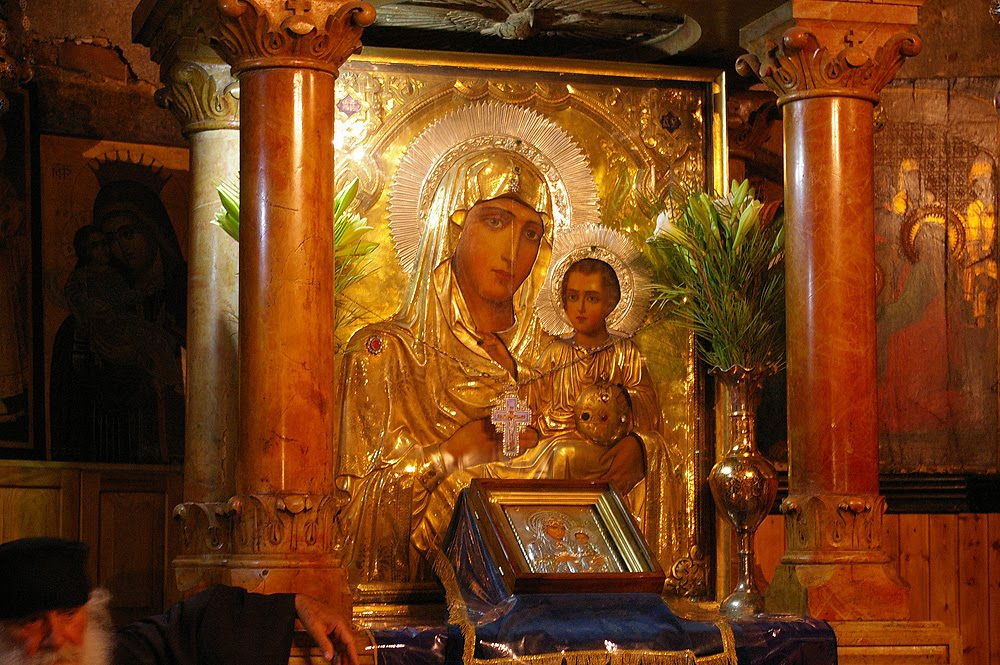
- Artist: Unknown
- Medium: Unidentified
- Subject: Mary the Mother of God with the Christ Child
- Location: Tomb of Mary in Jerusalem, Israel

The Panagia Ierosolymitissa icon (Greek: Παναγία Ιεροσολυμίτισσα) or the All-Holy Lady of Jerusalem icon of the Mother of God is an acheiropoieton located in the Tomb of Mary in Gethsemane in Jerusalem. The icon is considered by Orthodox Christians to be the patroness of Jerusalem. Although occasionally confused, the Panagia Ierosolymitissa icon is distinct from the Jerusalem Icon of the Mother of God.

== Description ==
The Panagia Ierosolymitissa is a variation of the popular Hodegetria type, in which the Virgin carries Christ in her arms. In the icon, Christ holds an orb in his left hand as his right hand extends in a gesture of blessing. Both figures in the icon have their bodies turned in a typical three-fourths twist of the body.

The medium with which this icon was painted is unidentified, although it appears to be oil on canvas. The majority of the icon is covered in riza, a decorative metal revetment that serves to protect the more delicate image underneath. The icon sits upon a stone antependium which has two Greek inscriptions that state that it was donated during the ecclesiastical reign of the Greek Orthodox Patriarch of Jerusalem, Damianos I (1897–1931), by a hegumen named Ioakeim Anyphantopoulos from Crete in the year 1906: "ΕΠΙ ΠΑΤΡΙΑΡΧΕΙΑΣ ΔΑΜΙΑΝΟΥ ΤΟΥ Α′ ΑΦΙΕΡΩΜΑ ΗΓΟΥΜΕΝΟΥ ΙΩΑΚΕΙΜ ΑΝΥΦΑΝΤΟΠΟΥΛΟΥ ΤΟΥ ΚΡΗΤΟΣ 1906"

A metal stamp on the riza (which was later added to the icon) indicates that it was crafted by a Moscow-based silversmith workshop of Borisov, and bears the date 1880. Greek letter abbreviations identify the Virgin and the Christ Child. A Russian inscription along the bottom edge of the icon says "Icon of the Jerusalem All-Holy Theotokos" (Russian: Обр.[аз] Iерусалимскiя Пр.[есвятой] Бци [Богородицы]).

== History ==
There are several theories and traditions about the origin of the icon.

=== Miraculous 19th-century creation ===
The commonly held story regarding the origins of the Panagia Ierosolymitissa is that it miraculously appeared in the year 1870. This story became popular due to a leaflet released by the Greek Orthodox Patriarchate of Jerusalem verifying it. According to this story, the Mother of God appeared in the form of a stranger to a certain monastic iconographer by the name of Tatiana who lived at the Russian Convent of Mary Magdalene (on the lower western slope of Jerusalem's Mount of Olives) and commanded her to paint an icon. When Tatiana began the work and came back the next day, the icon was miraculously completed and was suffused with the smell of incense. She informed the abbess, and together they relocated the icon to Gethsemane as the Holy Theotokos had instructed them.

=== Russian 20th-century painter ===
Another belief is that the icon was authored by a Russian nun named Sergiya (born near Tula, Russia, with the name Irina Trofimova) in the 1950s, and was miraculously saved from a flood. According to the research of Petr Stegniy, Irina Trofimova travelled to Palestine as a young woman where she became a nun at the Eleon Russian Monastery (the Monastery of the Ascension on the Mount of Olives) and was trained in iconography. She lived there for 30 years, died in 1968, and was buried at the Gornensky Monastery in Ein Karem. According to Stegniy, the Panagia Ierosolymitissa icon was restored by Sergiya after it was damaged in a flood, but was not painted by her. Sergiya's own words in a letter that she wrote in June 1956 attest to this:

"I now write icons for [the church of] the Mother of God in Gethsemane. You've probably heard that there was a flood and everything was damaged. Only one very large icon of the Mother of God in a kiot [icon case] under glass rose up to the ceiling and stood against the wall just in front of the Tomb of Theotokos. This is a great miracle, since even after being in the water for 5 days, it remained untouched, while other icons sunk for twenty-five days until the water was pumped out. Now I write all these icons for free and with joy..."

=== Mixed-style painting (Russian and Greek) ===
Dr. Anastasia Keshman, Art History teacher of the Hebrew University of Jerusalem, speculates that the icon is not of supernatural origin, but rather that it was authored by an unknown iconographer who was influenced by both Russian and Greek styles of iconography.

=== Travels ===
In January 2000, the icon was briefly flown from Gethsemane to the Metropolitan area of Kitiou to celebrate 2000 years since the birth of Christ. A formal procession occurred in the afternoon at the Church of the Savior.

On March 24, 2015, the icon was taken by the Exarch of the All-holy Tomb of Christ in Greece, Archimandrite Damianos, to the Holy Church of the Anargyioi (Holy Unmercenaries) in the Plaka, Athens where it remained until the end of Great Lent that year.

== Veneration ==
Some regard the Panagia Ierosolymitissa as the most accurate representation of the form of the Virgin. Paisios the Athonite is said to have had a special dedication to the icon, and had a picture of it in his cell on Mount Athos. He is quoted as saying, "The Panagia looks very similar to the icon of the Panagia Ierosolymitissa. She is exactly the same. I have seen her many times and I do not know of any other icon which resembles her more."

=== Apolytikion to the Panagia Ierosolymitissa (in the first mode) ===
We venerate thy holy image as the symbol of thy glory, All-Holy Virgin of Jerusalem, we venerate thee, O Holy Mother of God. From thee springest forth mysteriously rivers of miracles; and thou irrigatest the hearts and souls of them that cry unto thee in faith; Glory to the Divine Word, O Pure One, glory to thy virginity, glory to thy unfeigned providence towards us, O thou Holy One.

=== Another hymn ===
Speedily help, O Lady, those who reverently pray in the tomb of Gethsemane to thy form not made by hands, soaked by the water of our streams of tears, O Virgin, bright, Ierosolymitissa.

There also exists a Paraklesis service to the Panagia Ierosolymitissa.
