= Cust =

Cust or CUST may refer to:

== "Cust" ==
- Cust (surname)
- Cust, New Zealand, a village in Canterbury
- Cust River, a river in the Canterbury region of New Zealand

== Universities ==
- Capital University of Science & Technology, Islamabad, Pakistan
- Central University of Science and Technology, Dhaka, Bangladesh
- Changchun University of Science and Technology, in Changchun, Jilin, China
- Chengdu University of Science and Technology, in Chengdu, Sichuan, China
- China University of Science and Technology, Taipei, Taiwan
