= Richard Cust =

Richard Cust may refer to:

- Sir Richard Cust, 1st Baronet
- Sir Richard Cust, 2nd Baronet, of the Cust baronets
- Richard Cust (priest), clergyman, Dean of Rochester then Lincoln
