= Peregrine Cust =

Peregrine Cust may refer to:

- Peregrine Cust (1723–1785), Member of Parliament for Bishop's Castle (1761–1768), New Shoreham (1768–1774), Ilchester (1774–1775) and (1780–1785), and Grantham (1776–1780)
- Peregrine Cust (1791–1873), Member of Parliament for Honiton (1818–1826) and Clitheroe (1826–1832)
- Peregrine Cust, 6th Baron Brownlow (1899–1978), soldier and politician
