= Albinia Wherry =

British writer

Albinia Lucy Wherry (18 October 1857 – 4 March 1929), nee Cust, was a British nurse and author, known for her works on biography, art, and folklore.

== Early life ==
She was the oldest daughter of Robert Needham Cust and his wife Maria Hobart, and was born at Langdown House, Hampshire, the Hobart family home from 1849. Two months later her barrister father set off for British India, then torn by rebellion, where he would make a reputation as a colonial administrator and linguist. She had two sisters and two brothers; her mother died in 1864 a week after giving birth to a daughter. Her father returned from India; when back there in a senior administrative position, he took another wife, Emma Carlyon, who died in childbirth in 1867. He left India, and married again in 1868. He was survived by three of his children: Albinia (Alba); Robert Henry Hobart Cust (1861–1940), known as Robin; and the geographer Maria Eleanor Vere Cust FRGS.

== Family matters ==
Wherry's relationship with her father was intense, difficult and marred by grudges held. There was a serious break after her marriage. According to his biographer Peter Penner:

Her illness in infancy had spoiled his camp life and taken Maria back to England (away from him) in 1860. Now, in her adolescence, she threatened to spoil his peace of mind and to breach his walled garden. Influenced by her Hobart and Milner tutelage, as far as her father was concerned, she had behaved sullenly to him in 1866. Alba on the other hand, wrote in 1881 that at nine years of age (1866) she was taken out of the "only home I ever knew" [...]

As she grew up:

[...] he only wanted friendships to be formed within his class. Courtships and engagements should follow the etiquette which had governed his family a generation earlier. Robert seems to have been aware of Alba's affairs which, by her own account, began in 1872. Her second engagement to a cousin named Paget was broken off only in September 1880. According to Robert's Journal, on 25 September of that year Alba assured him that he was her "only friend". A week later he felt "easy" about Alba (and Robin) in Cambridge. Hence, it came as quite a "thunderbolt" when on 15 December he received a "pencil scrap" from Alba which announced that on the previous morning 'an event had happened and that I should hear from somebody in the morning!'

In 1881, Wherry married the surgeon George Edward Wherry and they produced a daughter, Beatrix Albinia, in 1887. It did something to pacify her father:

[...] he eventually accepted Beatrix Albinia (born 6 June 1887) as a "message of peace and love", something lovely, interposed between him and the unhappiness of 1881. Gifts of money and linen from him and a kind letter from Alba in Cambridge for his 67th birthday (1888) smoothed the way to a full reconciliation. Cust had hoped that once Alba herself became a parent she would better understand his feelings regarding family solidarity and cultural homogeneity. Robert replied to Alba's letter "assuring her of my hearty forgiveness, as I hope that she and her baby would come and pay us a visit".

== Later life ==
Wherry also trained as a nurse at Leicester Infirmary. In 1911 she was living with her husband at 5, St Peter's Terrace, Cambridge.

During World War I, Wherry was stationed in Paris in the Women's Emergency Canteen at the Gare du Nord where she supported Allied forces from 1915 to 1918. Wherry is buried in St John the Baptist Churchyard.

Her collected correspondence is archived by the University of Florida; additional work is found in the Wherry Collection at the British Library.

George Wherry died at Zermatt on 12 August 1928. Albinia died in a motor accident on 4 March 1929. They were survived by their daughter, who had married in 1914 Richard William Oldfield (born 1891) of the Royal Artillery, son of Col. Richard Oldfield.

== Family historian ==
The Chronicles of Erthig on the Dyke (2 vols., 1914) is about Erddig Hall in Wales, home of the Yorke family, who were related to Albinia Cust. (Victoria Mary Louisa Cust, daughter of Edward Cust and Albinia's first cousin, had married Simon Yorke III in 1846.) It is a collection of illustrative letters and other documents.

The house at Erddig and its records attracted attention after it was featured in Country Life in 1909. Albinia undertook the work, based on the Yorke archives, when the family was headed by Philip Yorke II (1849–1922), son of Simon III and Victoria. She was under instruction from Louisa Matilda Yorke (died 1951, nee Scott, daughter of the Rev. Thomas James Scott of Chilton Foliat), Philip's second wife, to omit matters "of a painful character".

The resulting work has been called "The story of a house, not of a family." It formed the basis of The Servants' Hall: the domestic history of a country house (first edition 1980; 1990, National Trust), a "below stairs" study by Merlin Waterson. Waterson calls the Chronicles "both invaluable and infuriating", particularly because of its length. He went back over transcriptions of letters, many of which were delegated by Albinia to family and friends, to remove errors and editorial changes.

Philip's son Simon Yorke IV (1903–1966) succeeded his father at Erddig, and came of age in 1924. In that year Albinia explained to Simon that she had weeded the archive by removing recent family correspondence, as not of interest. They were not on the best of terms, the "petulant" Simon writing to his mother "Alba is not in Cambridge, which is in a way a blessing."

The Albinia Book (1929) is not a conventional one-name study, concentrating as it does on a given name. It has the subtitle "being the history of Albinia Cecil and of those who have borne her name, with a new and particular account of the celebrated Albinia Bertie, countess of Buckinghamshire, and her immediate descendants, illustrations and genealogies collected by A. F. Stewart." Albinia Cecil was a daughter of Edward Cecil, 1st Viscount Wimbledon. Albinia Bertie after her marriage was known as Albinia Hobart. A. F. Stewart was the collaborator Albinia Stewart who finished the book after Albinia Wherry's death in 1929, with help from Robin Cust (whose original idea it had been). She mentions in the Introduction also the help given to Albinia Wherry by Horace Bleackley, as well as genealogical writers. Robin Cust, after the Introduction, attributed the idea to Bertie Hobart, and described Albinia Stewart as a cousin. She was Albinia Frances Adelaide Stewart (1879–1955), a grand-daughter of Henry Lewis Hobart, father of Maria Hobart.

== Other works ==
- Greek sculpture with Story and Song (1898)
- Stories of the Tuscan Artists (1901)
- Turner (1903)
- Daniel Defoe (1905)

== Ancestry ==
Ancestors of Albinia Wherry

16. Sir John Cust, 3rd Baronet
8. Brownlow Cust, 1st Baron Brownlow
17. Etheldred Payne
4. Rev. Henry Cockayne Cust
18. Sir Henry Bankes
9. Frances Bankes
19. Frances Pembroke
2. Robert Needham Cust
20. John Needham, 10th Viscount Kilmorey
10. Francis Needham, 1st Earl of Kilmorey
21. Anne Hurleston
5. Anna Maria Elizabeth Needham
22. Thomas Fisher
11. Anne Fisher
23. Margaret Pigot
1. Albinia Lucy Cust
24. John Hobart, 1st Earl of Buckinghamshire
12. George Hobart, 3rd Earl of Buckinghamshire
25. Elizabeth Bristow
6. Very Rev. Hon. Henry Lewis Hobart
26. Vere Bertie
13. Albinia Bertie
27. Anne Casey
3. Maria Adelaide Hobart
28. Blunden Moore
14. Richard Moore
29. Bridget Ford
7. Charlotte Selina Moore
30. James Trimmer
15. Charlotte Anne Trimmer
31. Sarah Kirby
