= Archer Cust =

British civil servant and art historian (1896–1962)

Sir Archer Cust OBE CBE
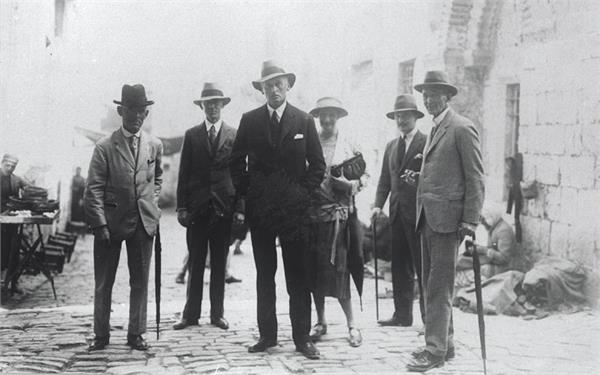
- Archer Cust (2nd from right) in 1929
- Born: Lionel George Archer Cust; 6 June 1896
- Died: 22 May 1962 (aged 65)
- Education: Eton College
- Father: Lionel Cust
- Relatives: Ronald Storrs (cousin)

Colonel Sir Lionel George Archer Cust CBE (6 June 1896 – 22 May 1962) was a British civil servant, art historian, and General Secretary of the Royal Empire Society.

He was the son of Sir Lionel Henry Cust, grandson of Henry Cockayne Cust, and great-grandson of Brownlow Cust, 1st Baron Brownlow and Francis Needham, 1st Earl of Kilmorey. He was educated at Eton and joined the Royal Artillery.

He received the OBE in 1939 and the CBE in 1954. He was knighted in 1959. He was a member of the Mandatory Palestine Civil Service from 1920-36. From December 1928 he was the private secretary to the high commissioner for Palestine.

Cust is notable for authoring the best known summary of the Status quo of Holy Land sites in 1929: The Status Quo in the Holy Places.

He was a cousin of Ronald Storrs.
