= John Cust (footballer) =

Scottish footballer

Personal information
- Full name: John Cust
- Date of birth: 10 December 1874
- Place of birth: Bonhill, Scotland
- Date of death: 1954 (aged 79–80)
- Position: Winger

Senior career*
Years	Team	Apps	(Gls)
1896–1897	Vale of Leven		
1897–1898	Bury	9	(1)
1899–1900	Clydebank		
1901	Renton		
Total		9	(1)
- * Club domestic league appearances and goals

John Cust (10 December 1874 – 1954) was a Scottish footballer who played in the Football League for Bury.
