= Robert Needham Cust =

British administrator and judge

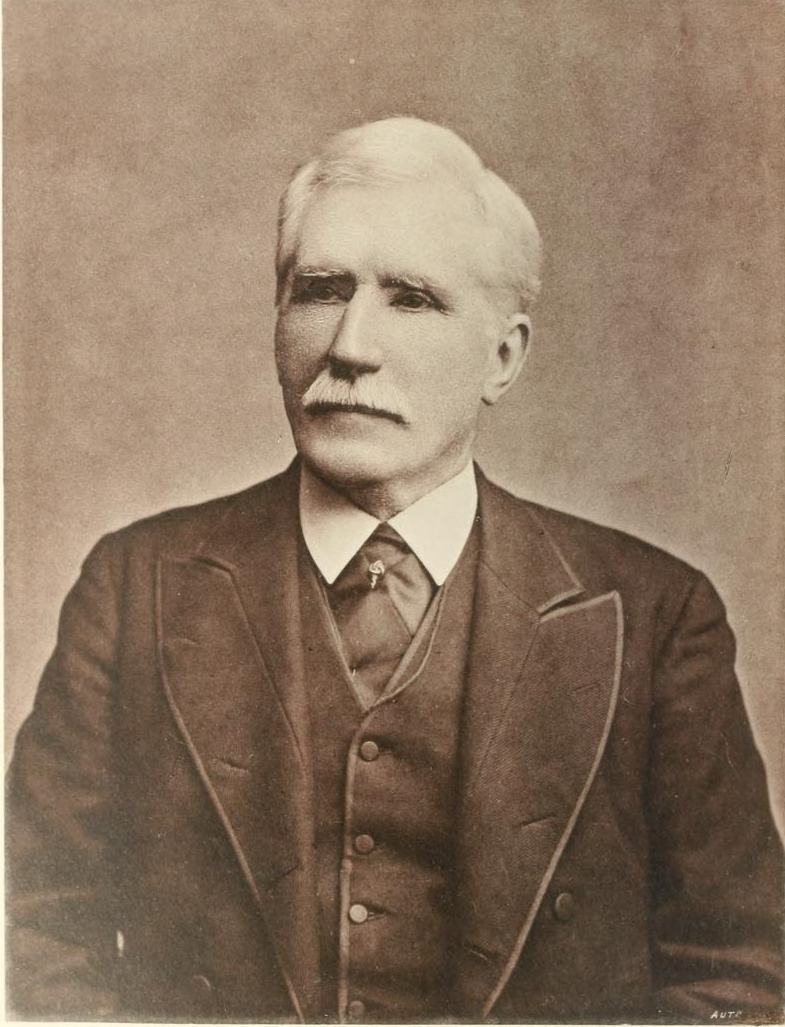
Portrait

Robert Needham Cust (24 February 1821 – 27 October 1909) was a British administrator and judge in colonial India apart from being an Anglican evangelist and linguist. He was part of the Orientalism movement and active within the British and Foreign Bible Society. He was a prolific writer and wrote on a range of subjects. He promoted the translation of the Bible into the Punjabi language as he believed it would help standardise the language's grammar and lead to the development of a strong literary tradition in the language.

== Early life ==
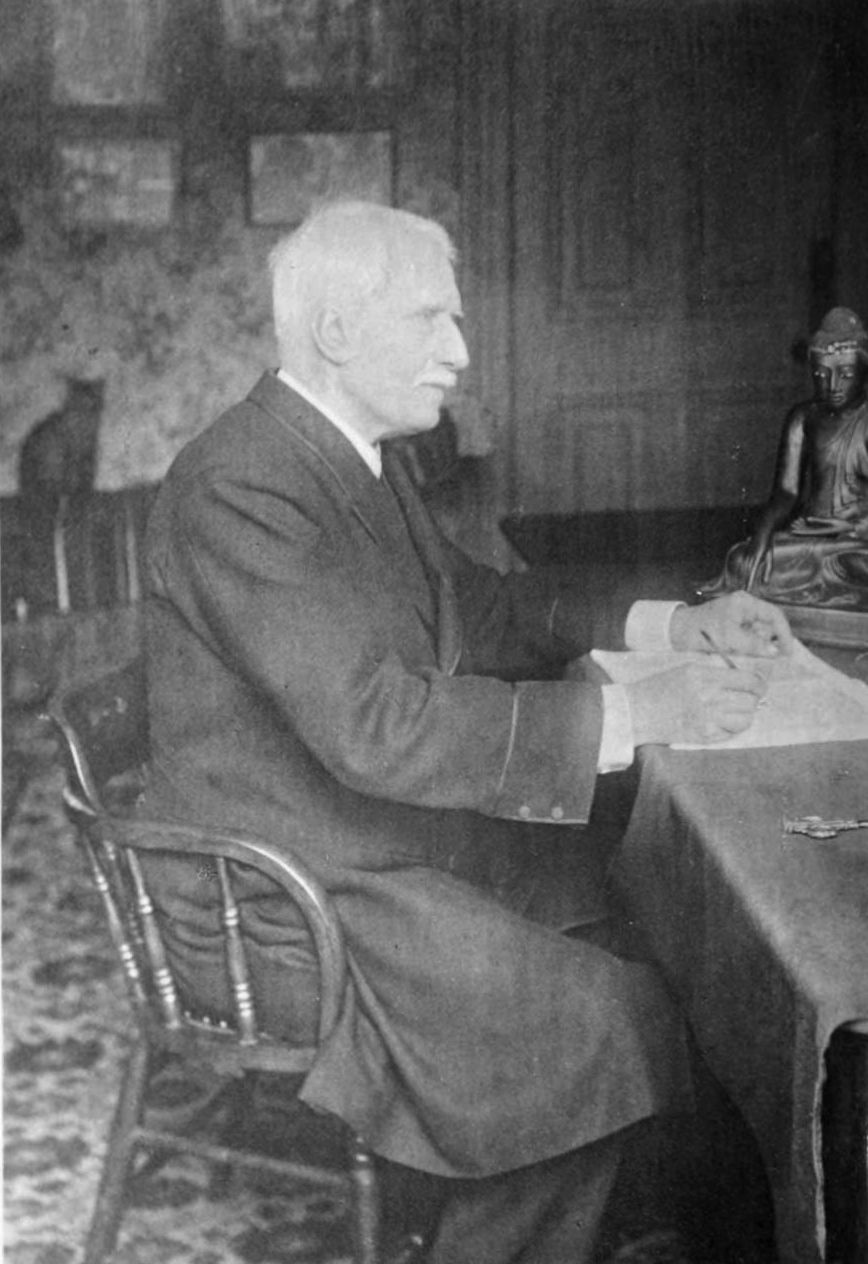
Cust in 1896

Cust was born to Reverend Henry Cockayne Cust, Canon of Windsor, who was the second son of Sir Brownlow Cust, 1st Baron Brownlow (1744–1807), and Lady Anna Maria Elizabeth Needham, daughter of the Earl of Kilmorey. His elder brothers were Henry Cockayne-Cust and Sir Reginald Cust.

== Education and career ==
Cust was educated at Eton College, Trinity College, Cambridge, Haileybury (1840–42) and the College of Fort William, Calcutta, graduating from the last-named institution in 1844. He then worked in the Bengal Civil Services for the East India Company, in Hoshiarpur and Ambala (assistant to the magistrate), in India.

He was present at the battles of Mudki, Ferozeshah, and Sobraon in 1845–46, where his superior Major George Broadfoot was killed and at the close of the Sikh campaign he was placed in charge of a new province in the Punjab. There he filled in succession every office in the judicial and revenue departments across Punjab, and was rapidly promoted until 1867, when he resigned and returned to England, after having been a member of the Viceroy's Legislative Council and Home Secretary to the Government of India in 1864–65. In 1859, he wrote the work The Life of Baba Nanuk covering Guru Nanak.

Cust returned to England briefly on furlough and returned to work in Benares and Banda. For his work he was offered the high post of magistrate and collector at Delhi. He declined the offer and went on furlough again to England in 1857. The officer who took up the post became a victim of the 1857 rebellion. Cust was called to the bar at Lincoln's Inn on 13 August 1857. Cust returned to India and served in Lahore at the request of Sir John Lawrence but left again for England when his first wife died on 17 January 1864. He then returned to join the legislative council and acted as home secretary to the government (1864–65). In 1867 his second wife died in childbirth and he decided to retire from Indian service even though he was just nine months away from completing the tenure needed to receive a full pension.

After retiring to England Cust devoted himself to scientific research, philanthropy, and magisterial and municipal duties, declining reappointments in India. He was a member and officer in many scientific, philanthropic, and religious societies and a prolific writer. He was one of the few Victorian intellectuals to oppose the racist theories popular at the time. Along with John Bradford Whiting, Cust was against the abandonment of Henry Venn's policy of developing indigenous leadership in Africa. In 1883 he wrote:

the vast majority of the educated public appears to have accepted at least some aspect of the new racial doctrine.

Following the Coronation of King Edward VII and Queen Alexandra on 9 August 1902, Cust wrote a letter to The Times, stating that he was probably among the very few people present for the coronation, who had also attended the coronation of King William IV and Queen Adelaide in 1831 and Queen Victoria in 1838.

== Death ==
Cust died on 27 October 1909.

== Personal life ==
Cust was first married to Maria Adelaide, daughter of Henry Lewis Hobart, Dean of Windsor on 10 May 1856. They had two sons and three daughters (one was Albinia Wherry). After her death on 17 January 1864, he was married again in December 1865 to Emma, daughter of rector E. Carlyon. Emma died on 10 August 1867 and is buried in Prayagraj. He married thirdly to Elizabeth Dewar daughter of J. Mathews in November 1868.

== Works ==
- The Life of Baba Nanuk, the Founder of the Sikh Sect of the Hindu Religion in the Punjab: For the Use of Schools : Compiled from Original Sources and Accompanied by a Map (1859)
- Draft Bill of Codes Regulating Rights in Land and Land-Revenue Procedure in Northern India (1870)
- A Sketch of the Modern Languages of the East Indies (1878)
- Linguistic and Oriental Essays in seven volumes Volume I 1846-1878 (1880) - Volume II 1840-1897 (1898) - Volume III 1847-1890 (1891)- Volume V 1861-1895 (1895) - Volume VI 1840-1901 (1901)
- Essay on the National Custom of British India: Known as Caste, Varna, or Jati (1881)
- Pictures of Indian Life (1881)
- Modern Languages of Africa. Volume I (1878) Volume II
- Notice of the Scholars who have Contributed to the Extension of our Knowledge of the Languages of British India during the last Thirty Years (1879)
- The Opium Question; or, Is India to be Sacrificed to China? (1885)
- The Shrines of Lourdes, Zaragossa, the Holy Stairs at Rome, the Holy House of Loretto and Nazareth, and St. Ann at Jerusalem (1885)
- Poems of Many Years and Many Places (1897)
- The Liquor Traffic in British India: Or, Has the British Government Done Its Duty? An Answer to Venerable Archdeacon Farrar and Mr. Samuel Smith (1888)
- Three Lists of Bible Translations Actually Accomplished (1890)
- Africa Rediviva (1891)
- Clouds on the Horizon: An Essay on the Various Forms of Belief, Which Stand in the Way of Acceptance of Real Christian Faith by Educated Natives of Asia, Africa, America, and Oceania (1891)
- Essay on the Prevailing Method of the Evangelization of the Non-Christian World (1894)
- Common Features Which Appear in All Forms of Religious Belief (1895)
- The Gospel-Message (1896)
- Memoirs of Past Years of a Septuagenarian (1899)
- Oecumenical List of Translations of the Holy Scriptures to 1900 (1900)
- The Last Scratch of an Octogenarian Pen (1903)

== Sources ==
- Thornton, Thomas Henry (1901). "Cust, Robert Needham" . In Lee, Sidney (ed.). Dictionary of National Biography (1st supplement). London: Smith, Elder & Co.
- Penner, Peter (1987). Robert Needham Cust, 1821-1909: A Personal Biography. Mellen Books. ISBN 978-0-88946-456-8.
- Buckland, C.E. (1906). Dictionary of Indian Biography. Swann, Sonnenschein and Co. p. 105.
