= Old Swan (disambiguation) =

Old Swan is a district of Liverpool, England.

It can also refer to:

- Old Swan (ward), a local authority ward of Liverpool City Council.
- Old Swan (chief), the English language name of Ackomokki, a Native American of the Blackfoot First Nation.
- Old Swan Band, an English country dance band.
- Old Swan Brewery, in Perth, Western Australia.
- Old Swan Hotel, in Harrogate, North Yorkshire.
- Old Swan, Gargrave, a pub in North Yorkshire
- Old Swan, Rhayader, a former pub in Rhayader, Powys.
