= Winterburn Chapel =

Chapel in Flasby with Winterburn, North Yorkshire, England

Coordinates: 54°01′26″N 2°06′01″W

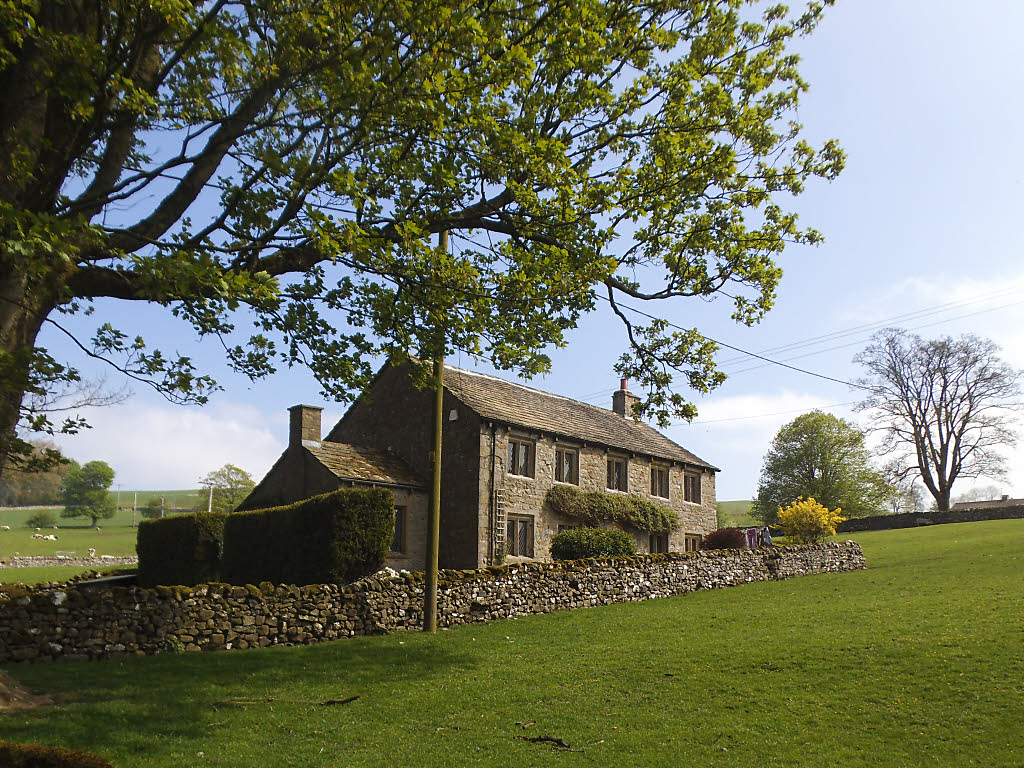
The building, in 2018

Winterburn Chapel is a historic building in Winterburn, a village in North Yorkshire, in England.

There was a mediaeval chapel in Winterburn, but it did not survive the English Reformation. In the mid 17th century, an independent congregation was established, meeting in the houses of John Hey and Richard Mitchell. In 1677, the first Nonconformist ordination in Yorkshire took place there. A few years later, a Mrs Lambert founded a dedicated Presbyterian chapel, intended to serve local miners. Oliver Heywood preached many of his earliest sermons in the chapel. The chapel was restored in 1862, when a vestry was added at the west end, at which time it was a Congregationalist chapel. There were further alterations in the 20th century. It was grade II listed in 1954, at which time it was serving as an Anglican chapel of ease to St Andrew's Church, Gargrave. It has since been converted into a house.

The building is constructed of rendered stone, with eaves modillions and a stone slate roof. It has one storey and five bays. The central entrance has a chamfered surround and a Tudor arched lintel, and the outer bays contain double-chamfered mullioned windows. At the west end is the gabled former vestry. Before conversion, it contained seven rows of box pews.

== See also ==
- Listed buildings in Flasby with Winterburn
