= 1874 Dissolution Honours =

British government recognitions

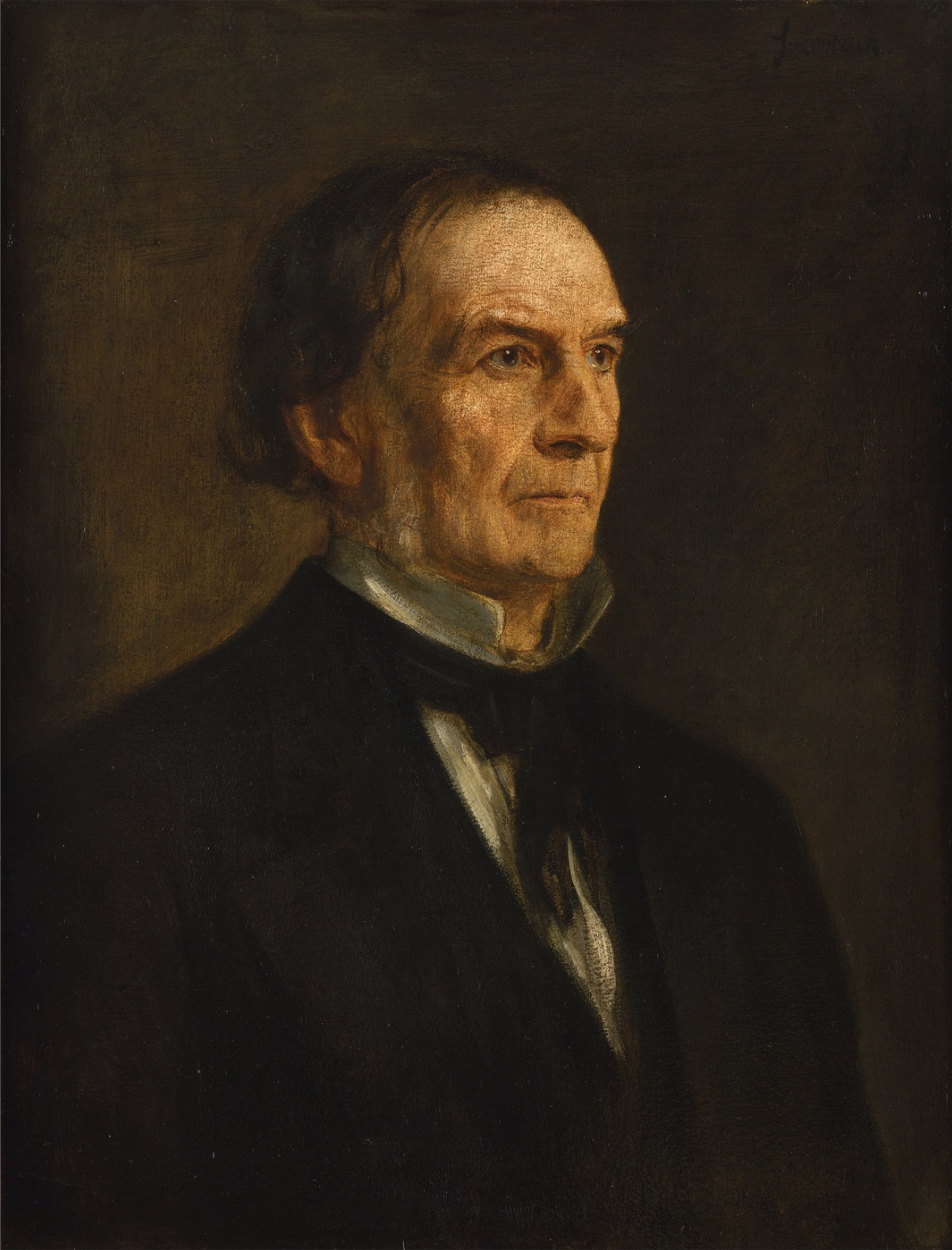
Prime Minister William Ewart Gladstone painted in 1874

The 1874 Dissolution Honours List was issued in February 1874 prior to the general election at the advice of the outgoing Prime Minister, William Gladstone.

The recipients of honours are displayed as they were styled before their new honour.

== Duke ==
- Hugh Lupus, Marquess of Westminster KG by the name, style, and title of Duke of Westminster, in the county of Middlesex

== Earl ==
- The Right Honourable John Robert, Viscount Sydney GCB by the name, style, and title of Earl Sydney, of Scadbury, in the county of Kent

== Viscount ==
- The Right Honourable Edward Cardwell, by the name, style, and title of Viscount Cardwell, of Ellerbeck, in the county Palatine of Lancaster

== Baron ==
- George Henry Charles Byng, Viscount Enfield, by the style and title of Baron Strafford of Harmondsworth, in the county of Middlesex
- The Right Honourable Chichester Samuel Parkinson-Fortescue, by the name, style, and title of Baron Carlingford, of Carlingford, in the county of Louth
- The Right Honourable Sir Thomas Francis Fremantle Bt by the name, style, and title of Baron Cottesloe, of Swanbourne, and of Hardwick, in the county of Buckingham
- The Right Honourable Edmund Hammond, by the name, style, and title of Baron Hammond, of Kirkella, in the county of the town of Kingston-upon-Hull

== Baronets ==
- Sir Charles Edward Trevelyan KCB of Grosvenor Crescent, in the parish of Saint George, Hanover Square, in the county of Middlesex
- Harry Stephen Thompson, of Kirby Hall, in the parish of Ouseburn Parva, in the West Riding of the county of York
- Mathew Wilson, of Eshton Hall, in the parish of Gargrave, in the West Riding of the county of York
- Charles Forster, of Lysways, in the parish of Longdon, in the county of Stafford
- Thomas Fraser Grove, of Ferne House, in the parish of Donhead Saint Andrew, in the county of Wilts
- George Burrows of Cavendish Square, in the county of Middlesex, and of Springfield, in the Isle of Wight, President of the Royal College of Physicians of London, and one of Her Majesty's Physicians in Ordinary.
- Thomas McClure, of Belmont and of Dundela, in the county of Down
- John Heathcoat Heathcoat-Amory, of Knightshayes Court, in the parish of Tiverton, in the county of Devon
- Richard Green-Price, of Norton Manor, in the parish of Norton, in the county of Radnor
- William Miller, of Manderston, in the county of Berwick
