= Paget Hall =

House in Gargrave, North Yorkshire, England

Coordinates: 53°58′49″N 2°06′17″W

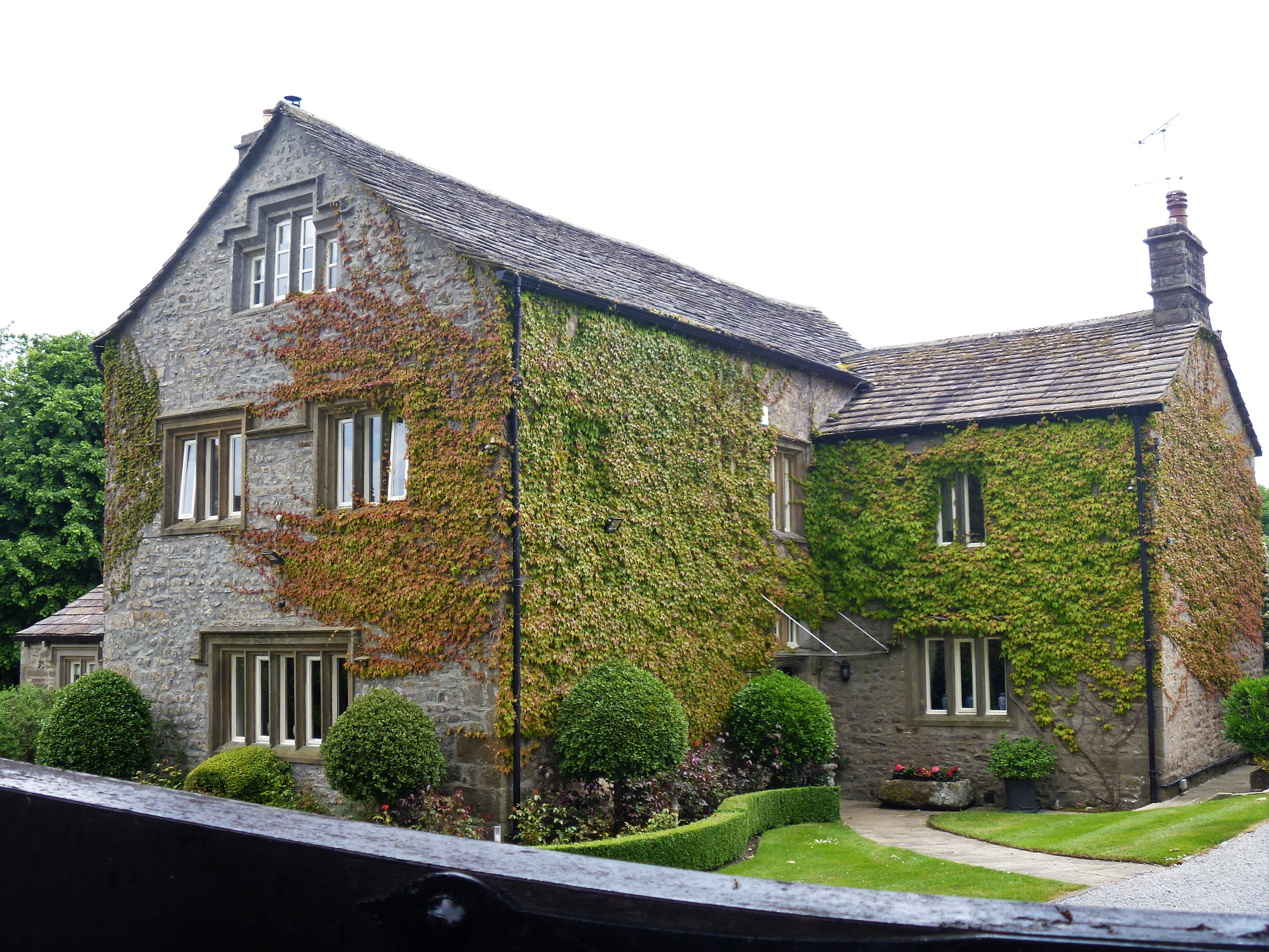
The building, in 2022

Paget Hall is a historic building in Gargrave, a village in North Yorkshire, in England.

The house was built in the early 17th century, but was heavily restored in the 19th century, the work removing many details. Despite this, many early features survive, including a garderobe in the hall chamber, and the late-17th century roof. The house was grade II listed in 1954.

The house is built of stone with stone slate roofs. It has a T-shaped plan, with a main block of two storeys and an attic, and two bays, and smaller two-storey wings to the north and the south. The windows are chamfered and mullioned with hood moulds. In the attic roof of the main block are four upper crucks. Inside, there are early fireplaces in both the east and west ground floor rooms, and the main staircase has a 17th century appearance, but may date from the 19th century restoration.

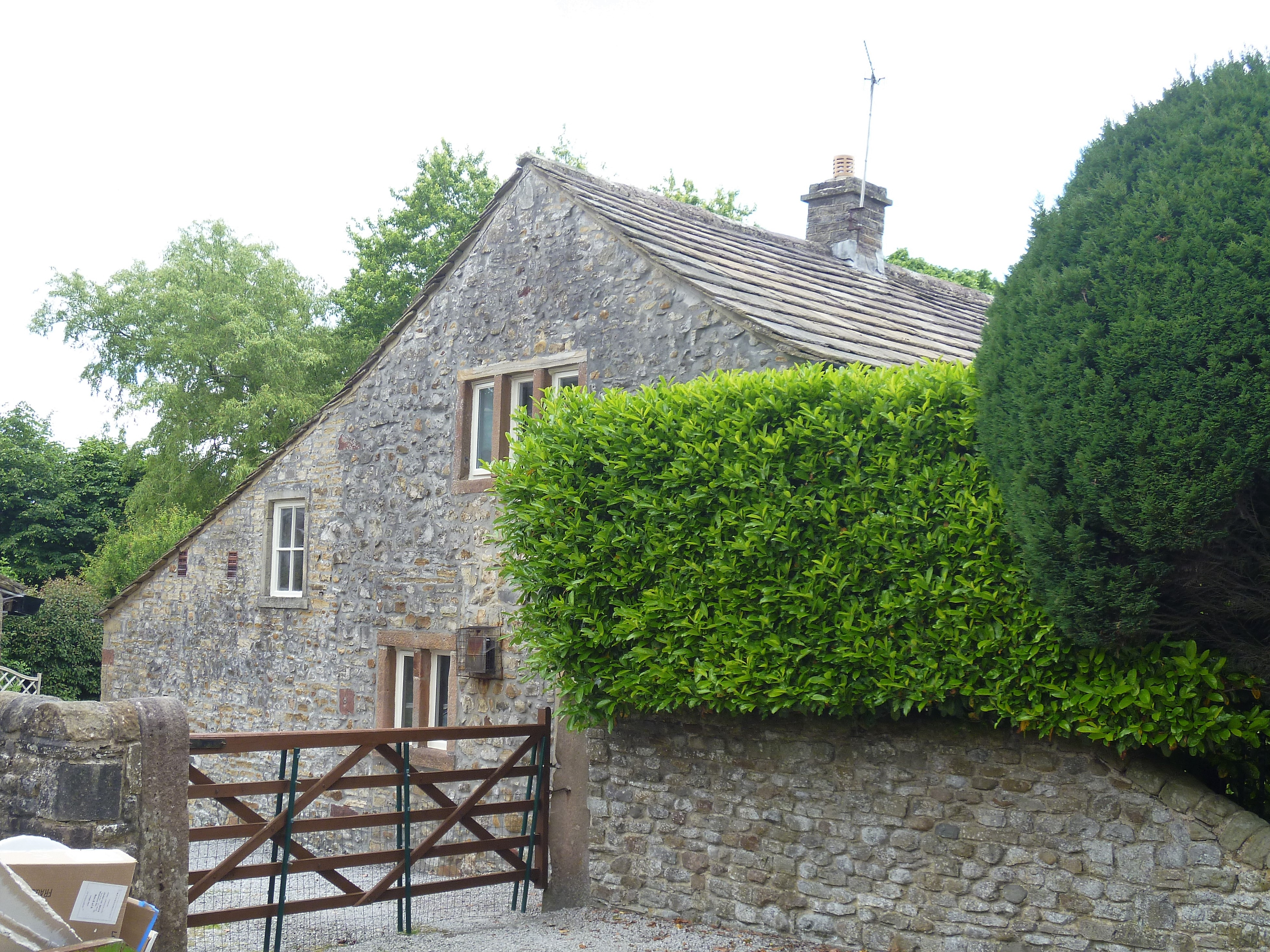
The outbuilding

The house has a grade II listed outbuilding, probably once a stable, which has been converted for residential use. It is in stone with quoins and a stone slate roof. There are two storeys, and it contains a window with a chamfered surround in the ground floor, a taking-in door above, and in the east gable is a dovecote.

== See also ==
- Listed buildings in Gargrave
