= Brockabank =

Historic Building in North Yorkshire, England

Coordinates: 54°00′29″N 2°06′05″W

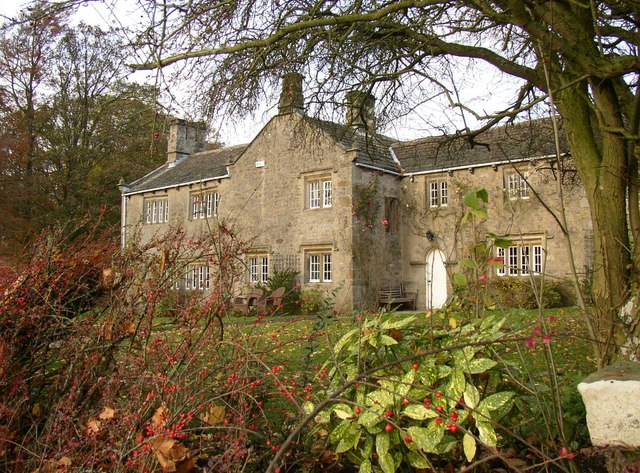
The house, in 2007

Brockabank is a historic building in Winterburn, a village in North Yorkshire, in England.

The manor of Brockabank was first recorded in 1188. The oldest parts of the current farmhouse date from the late 16th century, while much of the structure is early or mid 17th century. It was altered in the 18th century, heavily restored in the 19th century, and further altered in the 20th century. It was grade II* listed in 1954.

The building is constructed of stone, with shaped eaves modillions, and a stone slate roof with coped gables, and kneelers with ball finials. It has two storeys and five bays. On the front is a re-used doorway with a round-arched head, a chamfered surround, and moulded impost blocks. Most of the windows are chamfered and mullioned, some with hood moulds, and here are later casements. Inside, there is an inglenook fireplace.

== See also ==
- Grade II* listed buildings in North Yorkshire (district)
- Listed buildings in Flasby with Winterburn
