= Listed buildings in Flasby with Winterburn =

Flasby with Winterburn is a civil parish in the county of North Yorkshire, England. It contains twelve listed buildings that are recorded in the National Heritage List for England. Of these, two are listed at Grade II*, the middle of the three grades, and the others are at Grade II, the lowest grade. The parish contains the villages of Flasby and Winterburn and the surrounding countryside. Most of the listed buildings are houses, farmhouses and farm buildings, and the others consist of a bridge and a former chapel.

== Key ==
Grade	Criteria
II*	Particularly important buildings of more than special interest
II	Buildings of national importance and special interest

== Buildings ==
Name and location	Photograph	Date	Notes	Grade
Friars Head; 54.01376°N 2.10515°W		c. 1600	A large house in gritstone with a stone slate roof, consisting of a hall range and two rear cross-wings. There are two storeys, and a garden front of four projecting bays. Each bay has a gable with kneelers and ball finials, below which are mullioned and transomed windows with hood moulds, those in the top floor with three truncated-ogee lights. In the second bay is a porch with a moulded surround and imposts, a basket arch with voussoirs, and a Tudor arched doorway. Above is a hood mould, and a sundial with a gnomon and a moulded surround. Inside, there is a massive inglenook fireplace.	II*
Winterburn Bridge; 54.02260°N 2.10267°W		Early 17th century	The bridge carries Abbey Hill over Winterburn Beck, and was widened later. It is in stone, and consists of a single segmental arch. The bridge has voussoirs, on the downstream side is a string course, and the parapet is coped and ramped.	II
Brockabank; 54.00799°N 2.10145°W		Early to mid 17th century	The farmhouse, which has been extended, is in stone, with shaped eaves modillions, and a stone slate roof with coped gables, and kneelers with ball finials. There are two storeys and five bays. On the front is a re-used doorway with a round-arched head, a chamfered surround, and moulded impost blocks. Most of the windows are chamfered and mullioned, some with hood moulds, and here are later casements. Inside, there is an inglenook fireplace.	II*
Flasby Hall Tower; 54.00206°N 2.08527°W	—	Mid 17th century	A dovecote later used as a summer house, and now partly a ruin, in stone with millstone grit dressings. It is circular, with a diameter of about 7 metres (23 ft), and three storeys. The west entrance has a chamfered surround and a basket arched lintel over which is a gargoyle, chamfered stair lights, and three rows of pigeon holes. On the south side is an entrance with an eared architrave, and a pulvinated frieze, and a chamfered round-headed window with incised spandrels, over which is a window with a round head and a keystone.	II
The White House; 54.02437°N 2.10112°W	—	1666	The farmhouse, which was rebuilt in about 1900, is in stone with a slate roof. There are two storeys and two bays, with the gable end facing the road. In the centre is a doorway with a chamfered surround and a dated and initialled Tudor arched lintel with incised spandrels. The windows are mullioned and contain sashes. In the right gable end is a doorway with a chamfered surround and a Tudor arched lintel.	II
Flasby Hall Farmhouse and barn 54.00547°N 2.08057°W		c. 1670	The farmhouse and barn are in stone with stone slate roofs. The farmhouse has eaves modillions, coped gables and kneelers. There are two storeys and two bays. On the front is a blocked doorway with a chamfered surround above which is an initialled datestone, and the central doorway has a plain surround. The windows are recessed and mullioned. Inside, there is a massive inglenook fireplace. The barn to the left is lower, with three bays, and contains a segmental-arched entrance, a doorway with a chamfered surround and a Tudor arched head, and a round-headed window.	II
Cowper Cote Farmhouse; 54.02377°N 2.11803°W		Late 17th century	The farmhouse is in stone with sandstone dressings, eaves modillions and a stone slate roof. There are two storeys and three bays. The doorway has a plain surround and a gabled slate hood. Most of the windows are chamfered and mullioned, with some mullions missing. Inside, there is an inglenook fireplace.	II
Rookeries; 54.02541°N 2.10049°W		Late 17th century	The farmhouse is in stone with eaves modillions and a stone slate roof. There are two storeys and four bays, and a rear cross-wing. In the centre is a projecting gabled porch containing a chamfered surround and a basket arched lintel, above which is a single-light window with a chamfered surround. The other windows are chamfered and mullioned, and inside there is a massive inglenook fireplace.	II
Flasby Top Cottage; 54.00722°N 2.08440°W		1683	The house is in stone with square eaves modillions and a stone slate roof. There are two storeys and three bays. The central doorway has a chamfered surround, and a basket arched dated and initialled lintel. To the left is a three-light chamfered mullioned window with a hood mould, and above is a window with the mullions missing. The windows in the right bay are casements.	II
Winterburn Chapel; 54.02388°N 2.10020°W		1703–04	The chapel, later a private house, is in rendered stone, with eaves modillions and a stone slate roof. There is one storey and five bays. The central entrance has a chamfered surround and a Tudor arched lintel, and the outer bays contain double-chamfered mullioned windows. At the west end is a gabled former vestry.	II
Grange Farmhouse; 54.00580°N 2.08213°W		18th century	The farmhouse is in sandstone with eaves modillions and a stone slate roof. There are two storeys and three bays, and a lower one-bay extension on the left. The doorway has a chamfered surround and a Tudor arched lintel. The windows are mullioned, and at the rear is a mullioned and transomed stair window.	II
Flasby Hall; 54.00307°N 2.08355°W	—	1840	A large house designed by George Webster in Italianate style, and since much altered. It is in sandstone with chamfered quoins, a floor band, a modillion cornice and a slate roof. There are two storeys and an entrance front of three bays containing a projecting porch with a Gibbs surround and pilasters. Most of the windows are sashes, some in architraves, there is a Venetian window, and a blind round-headed window with rusticated voussoirs in the tympanum. The garden front has four bays, and contains a porch and a doorway with a fanlight.	II
