= Friars Head Hall =

Architectural structure in Flasby with Winterburn, North Yorkshire, England

Coordinates: 54°00′50″N 2°06′19″W

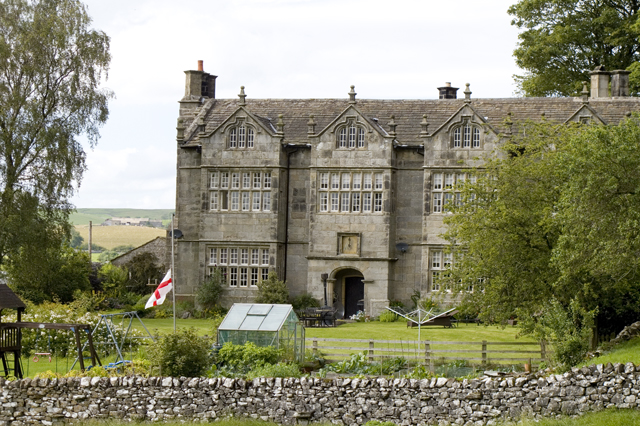
The building, in 2011

Friars Head Hall is a historic building in Winterburn, a village in North Yorkshire, in England.

In the mediaeval period, a monastic grange of Furness Abbey lay on the site. Friars Head Hall was first recorded around 1500, at which time it was owned by the Proctor family, who claimed to have held it since about 1300. The current building dates from the 17th century. It is in the Jacobean style, and is described by Nikolaus Pevsner as "unusually good". It was altered in the 19th century, and again in the 20th century. In 1954, it was grade II* listed.

It is a large house in gritstone with a stone slate roof, consisting of a hall range and two rear cross-wings. There are two storeys, and a garden front of four projecting bays. Each bay has a gable with kneelers and ball finials, below which are mullioned and transomed windows with hood moulds, those in the top floor with three truncated-ogee lights. In the second bay is a porch with a moulded surround and imposts, a basket arch with voussoirs, and a Tudor arched doorway. Above is a hood mould, and a sundial with a gnomon and a moulded surround. Inside, there is a massive inglenook fireplace, a small fireplace in the former parlour, and upstairs are three late 17th century door surrounds.

== See also ==
- Grade II* listed buildings in North Yorkshire (district)
- Listed buildings in Flasby with Winterburn
