= Listed buildings in Gargrave =

Gargrave is a civil parish in the county of North Yorkshire, England. It contains 42 listed buildings that are recorded in the National Heritage List for England. All the listed buildings are designated at Grade II, the lowest of the three grades, which is applied to "buildings of national importance and special interest". The parish contains the village of Gargrave and the surrounding countryside. The Leeds and Liverpool Canal and the River Aire pass through the parish, and the listed buildings associated with them are bridges, locks, and aqueducts. Most of the other listed buildings are houses, cottages and associated structures, and the rest include a church, farmhouses and farm buildings, a boundary stone, a milestone, a public house, and a telephone kiosk.

== Buildings ==
Name and location	Photograph	Date	Notes
St Andrew's Church; 53.98121°N 2.10515°W		c. 1600	The oldest part of the church is the tower, the rest dates from 1852, designed by Rohde Hawkins, and the whole church is in Perpendicular style. It is built in sandstone, yellowish in the tower, and red elsewhere, the aisle and tower have lead roofs, and the roofs elsewhere are in green slate. The church consists of a nave with a clerestory, north and south aisles, north and south porches, a chancel, and a west tower. The tower has diagonal buttresses, a three-light west window, above which is a niche, three-light bell openings, and an embattled parapet with eight crocketed pinnacles.
Paget Hall; 53.98019°N 2.10480°W		Early 17th century	The house is in stone with stone slate roofs. There is a T-shaped plan, with a main block of two storeys and an attic, and two bays, and smaller two-storey wings to the north and the south. The windows are chamfered and mullioned with hood moulds. In the attic roof of the main block are four upper crucks.
Outbuiding northwest of Paget Hall; 53.98031°N 2.10503°W		Early 17th century	The outbuilding, probably once a stable, has been converted for residential use. It is in stone with quoins and a stone slate roof. There are two storeys, and it contains a window with a chamfered surround in the ground floor, a taking-in door above, and in the east gable is a dovecote.
Church Close and barn 53.98086°N 2.10615°W		17th century (probable)	The house is rendered, the older barn is in stone, and both have stone slate roofs. The house, which dates from the later 18th century, has two storeys and three bays, a floor band, coped gables and kneelers. The central doorway has a hood, and the windows are sashes, with a single light above the doorway, and three-light mullioned windows elsewhere. The barn is long, it contains a segmental-headed cart entry, and has a catslide extension on the right and a wing on the left. The wing contains an elliptical-headed doorway with a chamfered surround, and a round pitching hole in the gable.
Old Hall Farmhouse; 53.98522°N 2.10540°W		17th century	The farmhouse, which has been altered, is in stone, partly whitewashed, with a stone slate roof. It consists of a main range with two storeys and a three-storey west wing. The wing is gabled and contains sash windows, in the west wall of the main range is a round-headed stair window, and most of the other windows have been altered.
12 and 14 North Street; 53.98475°N 2.10432°W		Late 17th century (probable)	The house is in stone with a stone slate roof, two storeys and three bays. On the front are two doorways with chamfered surrounds, and the windows are chamfered and mullioned, those in the ground floor with hood moulds.
17, 18 and 25 South Street; 53.98308°N 2.10404°W		Late 17th century (probable)	The house is in stone with a stone slate roof. There are two storeys and an attic, and three bays, the right bay consisting of a three-storey projecting gabled porch. The windows are double -chamfered and mullioned. Between the first and second bays is a doorway with a chamfered surround, and the windows in these bays have continuous hood moulds. The porch contains a chamfered doorway, above which is a three light window with a hood mould, and in the gable is a stepped three-light window with a hood mould. The gable is coped, and has heavy moulded kneelers. At the rear is a massive gable over three bays.
22 North Street; 53.98484°N 2.10482°W		1690	The house is roughcast with a stone slate roof, two storeys and four bays. The doorway has a chamfered surround and an elliptical head, and a lintel with a shield-shaped panel containing initials and the date, above which is a single-light window. The other windows are double-chamfered and mullioned, and over the ground floor openings is a continuous hood mould.
Boundary stone 53.97716°N 2.08270°W	—	1698	The boundary stone dividing two parishes is in millstone grit. It is about 65 centimetres (26 in) high, and inscribed with "T" on the east side, "ST" on the west side, and "11" on the top.
16 and 18 Church Street and barn 53.98226°N 2.10633°W		Late 17th to mid 18th century (probable)	A farmhouse, later a private house, with an attached barn, in stone with a stone slate roof and two storeys. The house has an L-shaped plan with a protruding left wing, and contains quoins, a string course, gutter brackets, gable coping and kneelers. In the wing is a doorway with a chamfered surround. The windows are a mix, some are chamfered and mullioned, some are sashes, and there is a modern window. The barn and shippon are attached to the right.
64, 66 and 68 High Street; 53.98329°N 2.10665°W		Mid 18th century (probable)	A house, later divided, in stone with a stone slate roof. There are two storeys and three bays. The left bay is bowed and rendered, with a sill band and a cornice, and it contains windows with three lights. The two doorways are to the right, with plain surrounds and cornices, The windows in the right two bays have three lights, the middle light wider and stepped, and mullions, those in the upper floor with architraves and cornices acting as hood moulds.
Park House and Park Cottage; 53.98329°N 2.10714°W		Mid 18th century	Two houses, the later one dating from the mid 19th century, in stone, with stone slate roofs and two storeys. Park House on the left is rendered, and has two bays. The central doorway has an architrave, and the windows are sashes with architraves and keystones. Park Cottage to the right forms a projecting gabled wing with two storeys and an attic. It has two bays, quoins, stone gutter brackets, and a central doorway with a cornice. The windows are either fixed or are casements, and on the gable apex is a ball finial.
Taira House; 53.98096°N 2.10568°W		18th century	The house has been extended and divided into two. It is in stone with stone slate roofs and has two storeys. The left part contains modern windows, and sashes above, and to the right is a range of five bays with pilasters, and further to the right is a taller extension with two bays containing a doorway with a cornice and consoles. At the rear is a canted bay window, and a tall round-headed stair window.
Coniston Bridge and causeway 53.99089°N 2.14108°W		1763	The bridge carries the A65 road over the River Aire, and was designed by John Carr. It is in stone, and consists of three round arches with triangular cutwaters. The bridge has voussoirs, bands, and a solid parapet sweeping to end piers, and at the mid-point on each side there is a further pier with a pyramidal cap. The causeway runs for 75 yards (69 m) yards to the east and has four low archways.
5 Church Street; 53.98178°N 2.10591°W		Late 18th century (probable)	The house is in stone, with rusticated quoins, gutter brackets and a stone slate roof. There are two storeys and three bays. The central doorway has a frieze incised with two lunettes, a cornice, and cut consoles. Above the doorway is a blind window with an architrave, and the other windows are sashes with plain surrounds. The front garden is enclosed by railings with fish-shaped motifs.
Brideholme; 53.98329°N 2.10626°W		Late 18th century (probable)	The house is in stone, with rusticated quoins, and a stone slate roof with coping and kneelers on the left. There are two storeys and four irregular bays. The doorway in the third bay has pilaster strips, an entablature and a fanlight. It is flanked by square bay windows, and the other windows are sashes, those in the left bay with lintels grooved to resemble flat arches.
Endsleigh House; 53.98328°N 2.10606°W		Late 18th century (probable)	The house is stuccoed, and has a stone slate roof, two storeys and a symmetrical front of three bays. In the centre is a doorway with a radial fanlight and a cornice on consoles, set in a moulded round-headed architrave. The windows are sashes with plain surrounds. At the rear is a doorway with a chamfered surround and a deep dated and initialled lintel.
Higher Land House and barn 53.98582°N 2.10715°W		Late 18th century	The house and attached barn are in stone with a stone slate roof. The house has two storeys, three bays, and quoins. The central doorway has large stones to the joins, and the windows are mullioned. The barn contains a segmental-arched cart entry.
The Grouse; 53.98327°N 2.10544°W		Late 18th century	A public house, later three houses on a corner site, in stone with hipped stone slate roofs and two storeys. The front on High Street has five bays, and contains sash windows, some tripartite. The front on West Street has three bays, a sill band, a central doorway and sash windows, those in the ground floor in recessed segmental arches. To the left is a taller wide bay containing two garage doors, and above is a large tripartite window under a segmental relieving arch, with engaged Ionic columns.
Anchor Lock; 53.98378°N 2.11536°W		c. 1790	The lock on the Leeds and Liverpool Canal is in stone. Its retaining walls are rebated for two sets of gates, the upper gate is in steel, and the lower is wooden.
Canal aqueduct at Holme Bridge; 53.98707°N 2.08905°W		c. 1790	The aqueduct carries the Leeds and Liverpool Canal over Eshton Beck. It is in stone, and consists of five low segmental arches, their faces and spandrels in line, surmounted by a tall slightly curved parapet set back in the centre.
Canal aqueduct at Priest Holme; 53.98017°N 2.12675°W		c. 1790	The aqueduct carries the Leeds and Liverpool Canal over the River Aire. It is in stone, and consists of three semicircular arches, with raised voussoirs, their spandrels in a flat plane. The parapet, which is solid and curved, has a band, and the abutments have piers.
Canal bridge No 168; 53.97958°N 2.12716°W		c. 1790	The bridge carries a road over the Leeds and Liverpool Canal. It is in stone and consists of a single elliptical arch with rusticated voussoirs, a band and a solid parapet. The curved abutments end in piers. On the south side, the towpath wall curves up to carry the towpath up and over the bridge.
Canal Bridge No 169 and integral lock 53.98184°N 2.12566°W		c. 1790	An accommodation bridge over the Leeds and Liverpool Canal, it is in stone and consists of a single segmental arch. The bridge has rusticated voussoirs, a band and a solid parapet ending in piers. The retaining wall is rebated for lock gates, the upper in steel and the lower in wood.
Canal Bridge No 170 and integral lock 53.98565°N 2.10652°W		c. 1790	The bridge carries Mark House Lane over the Leeds and Liverpool Canal. It is in stone and consists of a single segmental arch with rusticated voussoirs, a band and a parapet, pitched at the mid-point. The curving abutments end in piers. The footings of the bridge form the retaining walls for the integral lock. They are about 15 feet (4.6 m) at their highest and are rebated for wooden gates.
Canal Bridge No 171 and integral lock 53.98667°N 2.10208°W		c. 1790	The bridge carries Eshton Road over the Leeds and Liverpool Canal. It is in stone and consists of a single segmental arch with rusticated voussoirs, a band and a parapet, pitched at the mid-point. The curving abutments end in piers. The footings of the bridge form the prolonged retaining walls for the integral lock, and are rebated for the gates.
Canal bridge No 172; 53.98783°N 2.09505°W		c. 1790	The bridge carries Ray Bridge Lane over the Leeds and Liverpool Canal. It is in stone and consists of a single elliptical arch with rusticated voussoirs, a band and a solid parapet. The curved abutments end in piers.
Scarland Lock; 53.98338°N 2.12115°W		c. 1790	The lock on the Leeds and Liverpool Canal is in stone. Its retaining walls are rebated for two sets of wooden gates.
Gargrave House; 53.98670°N 2.11065°W		c. 1800	The house, later used for other purposes, was extended and remodelled between 1913 and 1917. The house is in Yorkshire rag-stone, and has roofs in Caithness slate. On the garden front is the main doorway that has pilasters and an open pediment. This is flanked by full-height bow windows, the right with a balcony, and both with gabled pediments. On the southeast front is a double-arched portico, tall windows, and roof dormers with round-arched tops.
The Old Swan Hotel; 53.98433°N 2.10380°W		Late 18th or early 19th century	The public house is rendered and has a concrete tile roof. There are three storeys and three bays. The central doorway has engaged Doric columns carrying a hood. Above the doorway is a tall stair window, and the other windows are mullioned with two lights.
8 and 10 North Street; 53.98475°N 2.10417°W		Early 19th century	A pair of cottages with quoins and a stone slate roof. There are two storeys and each cottage has one bay. The doorway on the left of each cottage has a plain surround, and the windows are sashes with two lights and mullions.
11 South Street; 53.98318°N 2.10319°W	—	Early 19th century	The house is in painted stone with a stone slate roof. There are two storeys and two bays. In the right bay is a sash window in each floor, and the left bay has a two-light mullioned window in each floor. To the left is a doorway, and further to the left is a passage door with a painted lintel.
Ivy House Farm; 53.98355°N 2.10237°W		Early 19th century	The house is rendered, and has a stone slate roof, two storeys and three bays. The doorway has pilasters and a fanlight, and the windows are tall sashes.
Story's House; 53.98458°N 2.10446°W		1828	A house and former schoolroom in stone with a stone slate roof. There are two storeys and three bays, and a projecting wing on the left which was the schoolroom. The doorways in the main range and the wing have plain surrounds, and the windows are sashes with plain surrounds.
3 Church Street; 53.98189°N 2.10596°W		Early to mid 19th century	A stone house with quoins and a stone slate roof. There are two storeys, and four bays, the third bay slightly recessed and containing a segmental carriage entry with a triple keystone. The doorway to the left has a plain surround and residual imposts. The window in the ground floor of the fourth bay is a casement, and the other windows are horned sashes with plain surrounds.
Milton House; 53.98146°N 2.11565°W	—	Early to mid 19th century	A mill owner's house, later used for other purposes, it is pebbledashed, on a stone plinth, with stone dressings, a sill band, an eaves band with paired gutter brackets, and a hipped Lakeland slate roof. There are two storeys and five bays, the middle bay recessed. The central doorway is in a segmental-arched recess, and has an architrave with panelled pilasters, a frieze, a cornice and a blocking course. The windows are sashes, the window above the doorway with an architrave and a panelled frieze. In the left return is a French window.
Sunnyside; 53.98328°N 2.10684°W		Early to mid 19th century	The house is in stone, the front with channelled rustication, a sill band, a cornice and a blocking course. It has a hipped slate roof, and two storeys. The front facing the street has one bay, and it contains a two-storey canted bay window with sashes and mullions. Above the ground floor lights are rebated sunk panels. On the return are three bays, with sash windows, and a central doorway with a hood on consoles. At the rear is a tall round-headed stair window.
Toll Bar House; 53.98531°N 2.08429°W		1840s	The former toll house is in limewashed stone, with painted stone dressings, and a hipped stone slate roof with tile coping. There is a single storey and three bays. The doorway has a plain surround, and the windows are casements with splayed surrounds and hood moulds.
Gargrave Bridge; 53.98279°N 2.10617°W		19th century	The bridge carries a road over the River Aire. It is in stone, and consists of three elliptical arches, with the spandrels formed from prolonged voussoirs. The cutwaters are splayed back to form piers, the parapets are solid, and there are square piers at the abutments. At the north end are quadrant retaining walls with iron railings ending in round piers with heavy caps.
Milestone at Holme Bridge; 53.98631°N 2.08971°W	—	19th century	The milestone on the south side of the A65 road adjacent to the Leeds and Liverpool Canal is in cast iron on a stone base. It has a triangular plan and a rounded top. On the top is inscribed "Keighley and Kendal Road" and "Gargrave", and on the sides are the distances to Skipton, Keighley, Settle and Kendal.
The Dalesman Café; 53.98328°N 2.10591°W		Mid 19th century	The house and café are in stone, with quoins, a moulded eaves cornice, and a stone slate roof. There are two storeys and a front of three bays. On the front are doorways, a shopfront, and the windows are sashes.
Telephone kiosk 53.98298°N 2.10577°W		1935	The K6 type telephone kiosk was designed by Giles Gilbert Scott. Constructed in cast iron with a square plan and a dome, it has three unperforated crowns in the top panels.
