= Listed buildings in Eshton =

Eshton is a civil parish in the county of North Yorkshire, England. It contains eleven listed buildings that are recorded in the National Heritage List for England. Of these, one is listed at Grade II*, the middle of the three grades, and the others are at Grade II, the lowest grade. The parish contains the village of Eshton and the surrounding area. The most important building in the parish is Eshton Hall, which is listed, and most of the other listed buildings are associated with it or in its grounds. The rest of the listed buildings include farmhouses, barns and a well.

== Key ==
Grade	Criteria
II*	Particularly important buildings of more than special interest
II	Buildings of national importance and special interest

== Buildings ==
Name and location	Photograph	Date	Notes	Grade
Home Farmhouse and the Lodge; 54.00125°N 2.09942°W		17th century	A cross-wing was added to the farmhouse in about 1850 to form a lodge to Eshton Hall. The building is in stone with quoins, a stone slate roof and two storeys. The farmhouse has three bays, and a projecting two-storey porch on the left, the upper storey jettied, and gabled with coping, kneelers and ball finials. The doorway has a chamfered surround, and the windows are double-chamfered and mullioned, those in the ground floor with hood moulds. The later cross-wing on the right has one bay at the front and three on the right return. The windows are cross windows, and on the front is a canted bay window.	II
Barn west of Eshton Hall; 54.00054°N 2.09874°W	—	Early 18th century (probable)	The barn is in limestone with sandstone dressings, and a stone slate roof with coped gables, kneelers and a finial on the left apex. On the road front is a large cart entrance with a segmental head, and in the right gable end are three blocked openings.	II
St Helen's Farmhouse; 54.00642°N 2.10905°W		Mid 18th century	The farmhouse is in stone, with rusticated quoins, a string course stepped up to the quoins, and a stone slate roof with a cornice forming kneelers to the coped gables. There are two storeys and five bays. The central doorway has an eared architrave and a large segmental pediment. The windows are sashes in architraves, in the right gable is a small oculus, and at the rear is a tall stair window.	II
Eshton Grange; 54.00342°N 2.10310°W	—	1753	A farmhouse in stone, with quoins, gutter brackets and a stone slate roof. There are three storeys and two bays. The doorway has pilasters, a frieze and a cornice, and above it is a dated and initialled plaque with a moulded surround. The windows are sashes with plain surrounds. In the left return is an oculus, above which is an inscribed plaque. At the rear is a three-light double-chamfered and mullioned window.	II
New Laithe; 54.00768°N 2.10871°W	—	Late 18th century (probable)	A barn in limestone with sandstone dressings, quoins, and a stone slate roof with coped gables and kneelers. On the road front is a large cart entrance with a segmental head, and windows. In the left return is a doorway with a chamfered surround, and in the gable is a dovecote.	II
St Helen's Well; 54.00899°N 2.10686°W		18th or 19th century (probable)	Probably of medieval origin, it consists of a spring forming a pool in a hollow in the ground. On the side of the outflow is a small stone kerb, which incorporates a carved boss.	II
Eshton Mews and the Coach House; 54.00156°N 2.09864°W	—	c. 1825	The stables and coach house have been converted for residential use. The building is in stone with a hipped stone slate roof. There are two storeys and a U-shaped plan. The main range is flanked by square turrets with chamfered corners and pyramidal roofs. In the centre is a pediment containing a coat of arms, and the wings have dormers and gables with kneelers and finials.	II
Eshton Hall; 54.00000°N 2.09641°W		1825–27	A country house, designed by George Webster, in stone with slate roofs. The main block has two storeys and fronts of five bays, the outer bays on the main front projecting, with a continuous coped parapet. On the front is a two-storey porch with coupled Doric antae and ornamental cresting. The windows are mullioned and transomed and contain horizontally-sliding sashes. To the right of the main block is an octagonal turret, with three stages, a scalloped crest, an ogee lead cupola, and a dated and initialled weathervane. Further to the right is a service wing with two storeys and nine bays, containing a gabled gatehouse with an oriel window and a gabled bellcote.	II*
Gates and gate piers, Eshton Hall; 53.99900°N 2.09647°W		1825–27	The gates and gate piers at the main entrance to the hall were designed by George Webster. The piers are in stone, they are square on a plinth, and have Doric pilasters and an entablature with triglyphs. They are flanked by scrolls descending to short wing walls that end in octagonal piers with cornices and ball finials. The gates have star finials and rosettes in cast iron, and a scrolly infill in wrought iron.	II
Terrace wall, Eshton Hall; 53.99998°N 2.09596°W	—	1825–27	The retaining wall to the west of the terrace was designed by George Webster. It is in stone with coping, and is punctuated by piers.	II
Railings to west of Eshton Hall; 53.99761°N 2.09580°W		Early 19th century (probable)	The railings run along both sides of the road south of the main entrance to the hall for about 400 metres (1,300 ft). The bollards are in cast iron and consist of a Doric column with a Greek capital on an octagonal base, and they are connected by rails.	II
