= Gargrave =

Village and civil parish in North Yorkshire, England

Coordinates: 53°59′01″N 2°06′18″W

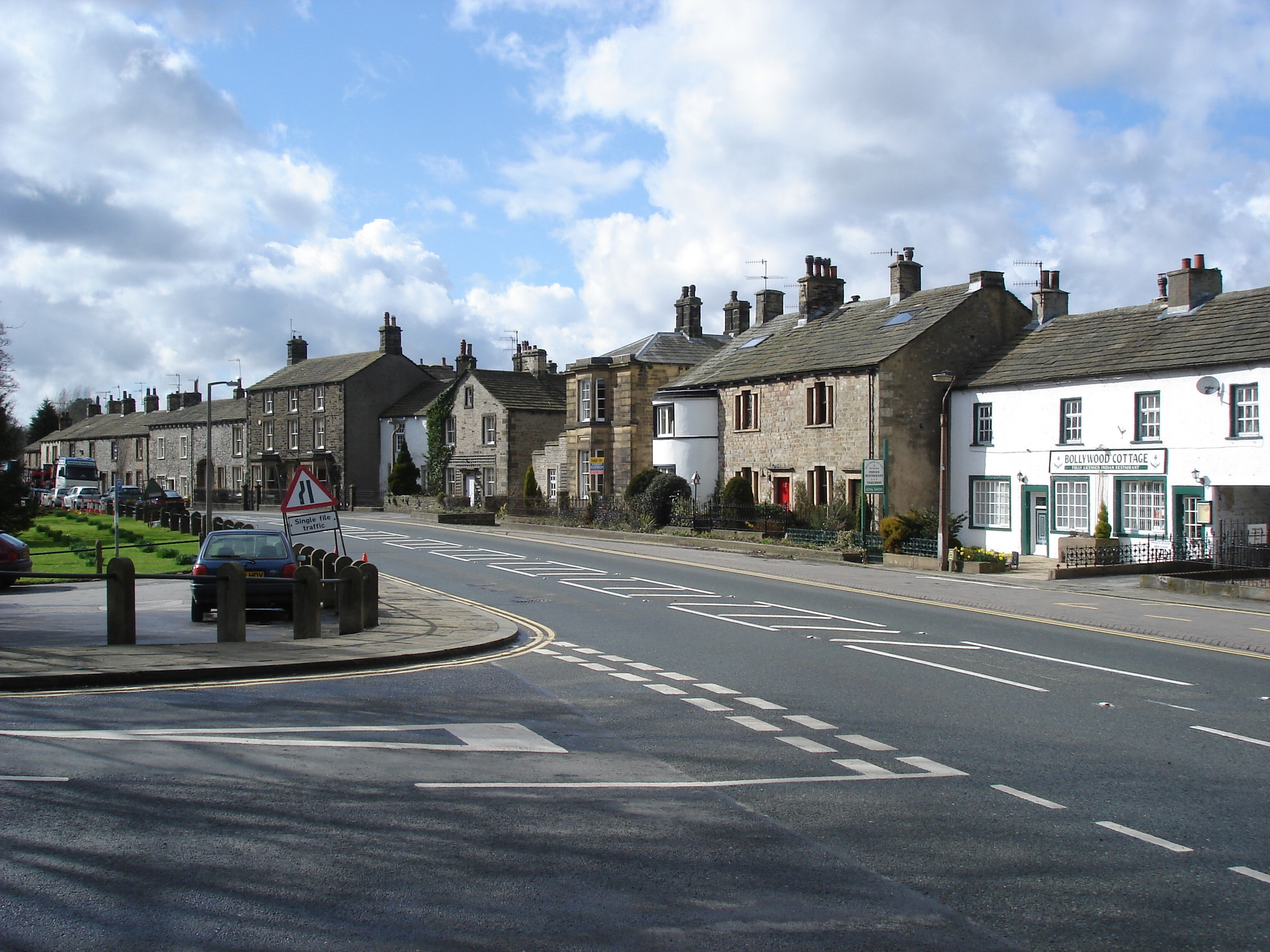
- A view of the village of Gargrave

- Location within North Yorkshire
- Population: 1,755 (including Bank Newton)
- OS grid reference: SD931541
- Civil parish: Gargrave
- Unitary authority: North Yorkshire
- Ceremonial county: North Yorkshire
- Region: Yorkshire and the Humber
- Country: England
- Sovereign state: United Kingdom
- Post town: SKIPTON
- Postcode district: BD23
- Dialling code: 01756
- Police: North Yorkshire
- Fire: North Yorkshire
- Ambulance: Yorkshire
- UK Parliament: Skipton and Ripon

Gargrave is a large village and civil parish in the county of North Yorkshire, England. It is located along the A65, 4 miles (6 km) north-west of Skipton. The village is situated on the very edge of the Yorkshire Dales; the River Aire and the Leeds and Liverpool Canal pass through it. It had a population of 1,764 at the 2001 census, reducing slightly to 1,755 in 2011. Until 1974 it was part of the West Riding of Yorkshire and it was part of the Craven District from 1974 to 2023; it is now administered by the unitary North Yorkshire Council.

== Etymology ==
Multiple etymologies have been proposed for the name Gargrave. The name may contain Old English gāra in its original meaning of "spear" formed with graf apparently meaning wood, originally meaning "wood from which spear-shafts were cut". The first part of the name may also have had the sense "triangular piece of land" and was replaced by the cognate Old Norse gieri. Also suggested is that the name contains one of the Old Norse names with Geir- (e.g. Geirmundr, Geirlaug) with the Old English termination græf, "grave, trench", Gargrave therefore meaning "grave of the Scandinavian Giermundr, Geirlaug etc". William Wheater thought Gargrave to be derived the Celtic caer and the Saxon gerefa, meaning "the camp or city of the reeve/governor". The element -grave may be a "Celtic lenited" variant of Craven.

== History ==
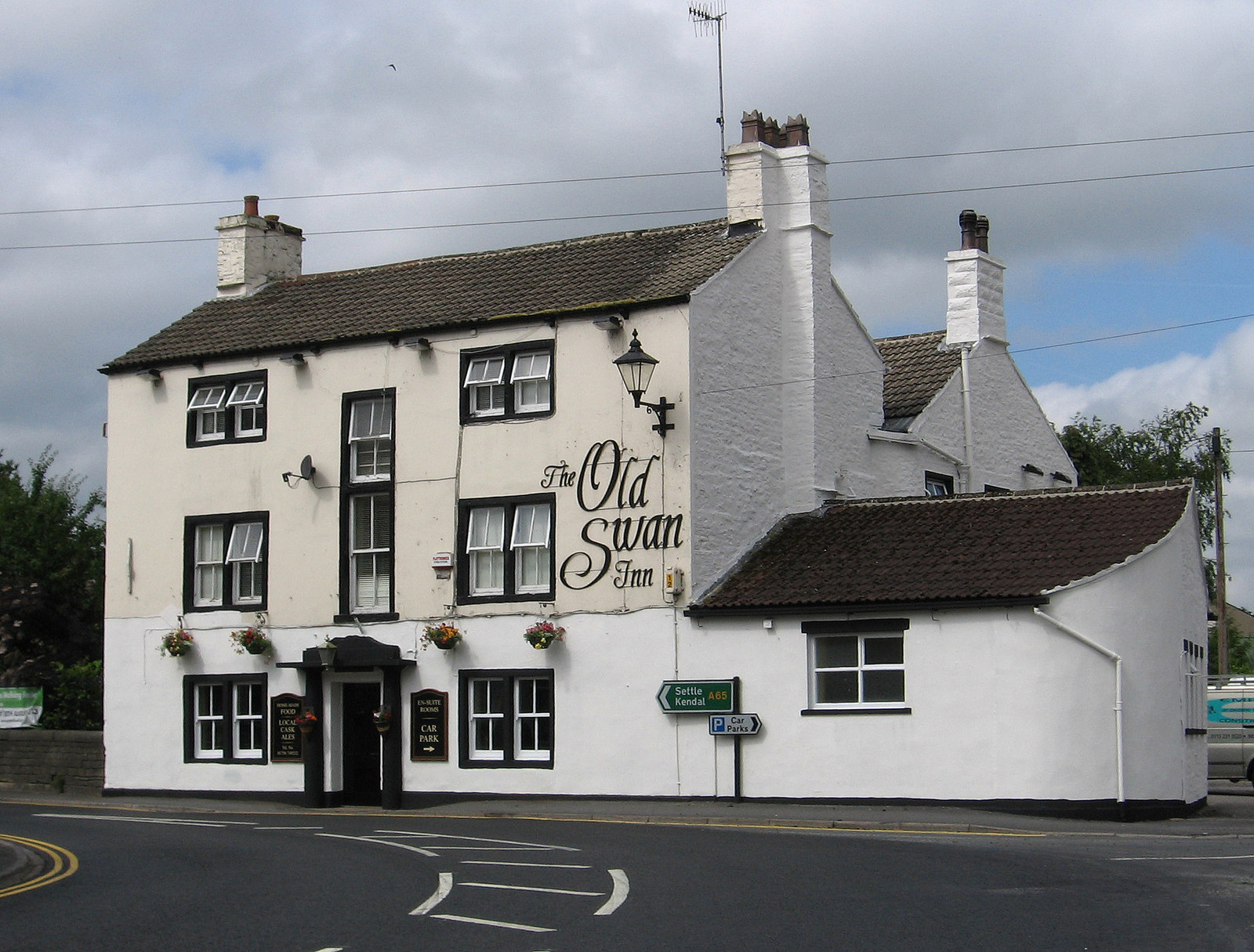
Gargrave – The Old Swan

In the second century, the Romans built a villa in flat meadowland near the River Aire at Kirk Sink; it was excavated in 1968–1974 by Brian Hartley. Its central room had a seven-metre square mosaic floor and a bath house was built alongside. The villa was surrounded by two ditches.

In the 1820s, the main industry in Gargrave was cotton manufacturing and there were numerous warehouses along the side of the canal. The population at this time was 972 and there were several public houses including the Masons Arms and the Swan Inn.

Gargrave House was built in 1917 by the distinguished Scottish architect, James Dunn; it is a Grade II listed building.

The Old Swan is also Grade II listed and was named the Keighley and Craven CAMRA Pub of the Season in summer 1998.

== Governance ==
Gargrave was in the Gargrave and Malhamdale ward of the non-unitary authority, Craven District Council, also served by the North Yorkshire County Council for local services. The population of this ward at the 2011 Census was measured at 3,037.

Since 2023, it has been part of the Mid Craven ward of the unitary North Yorkshire Council.

The village is in the Skipton and Ripon constituency of the UK Parliament; the seat is held currently by Julian Smith of the Conservative Party.

== Transport ==
The main road through Gargrave is the A65 Leeds to Kendal road. There has been a long-running campaign to have a by-pass built around the village, given the volume of traffic it provides.

Northern Trains operates regular services from Gargrave railway station to Skipton and Leeds in the east; Morecambe and Carlisle are destinations to the west and north-west.

Local bus services are operated by Kirkby Lonsdale Coaches, Keighley Bus Company and North Yorkshire Council; destinations include Skipton, Settle, Malham, Barnoldswick and Preston.

The Leeds and Liverpool Canal passes through Gargrave.

== Religion ==
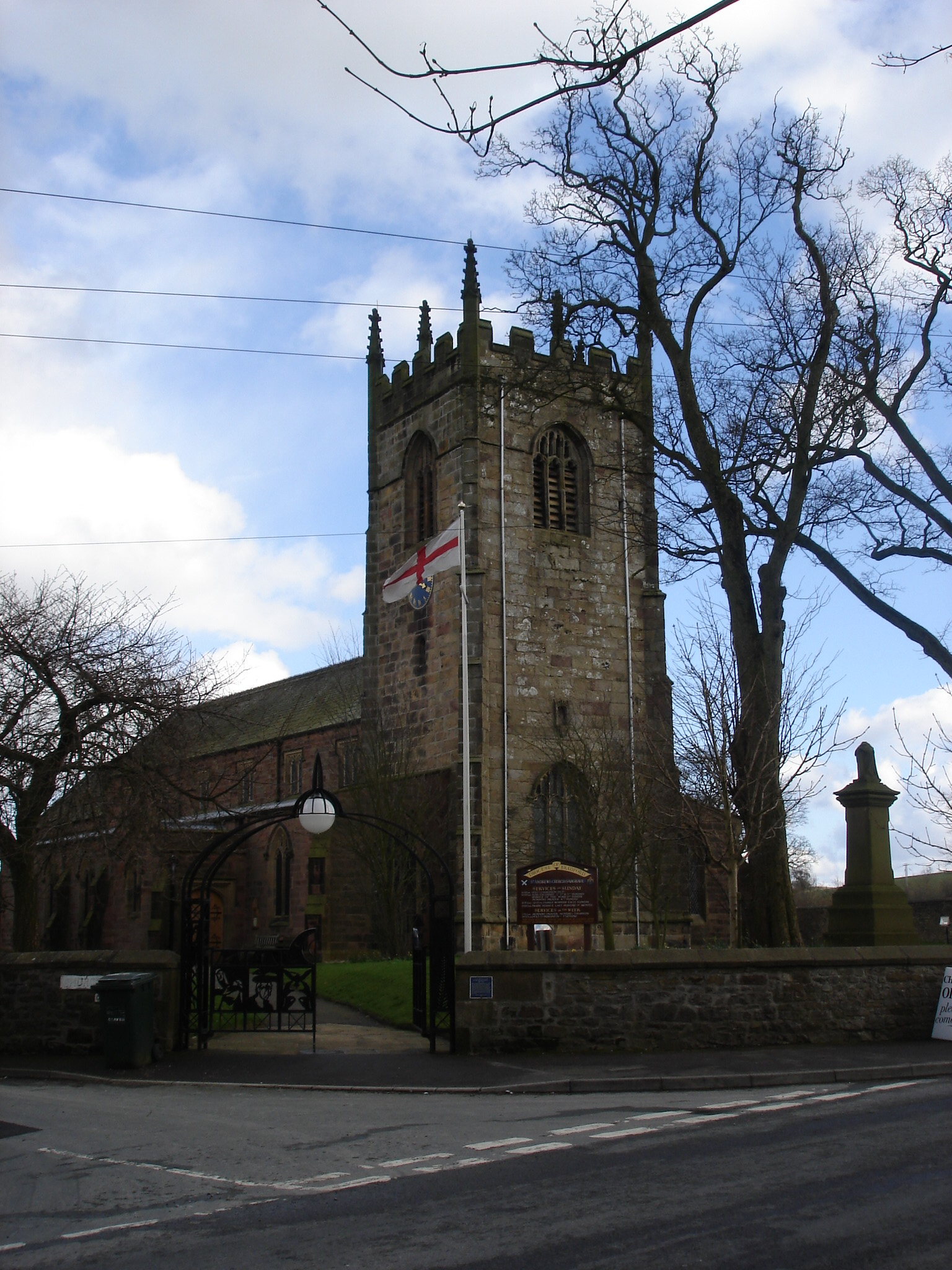
Gargrave Church

Gargrave was the centre of an ancient parish which also included the townships of Bank Newton, Coniston Cold, Eshton, and Flasby with Winterburn. Henry de Percy, 1st Baron Percy of Alnwick, granted the advowson of Gargrave Church and its chapels of ease to Sawley Abbey before his death in 1314.

St Andrew's Church, Gargrave was built in 1521 and restored in 1852, although there is thought to have been a church on the site long before this time. Robert of Newminster, who was born in the parish in about 1100, was an early rector. Former Chancellor of the Exchequer Iain Macleod is buried in the south-east corner of the churchyard.

== Leisure ==
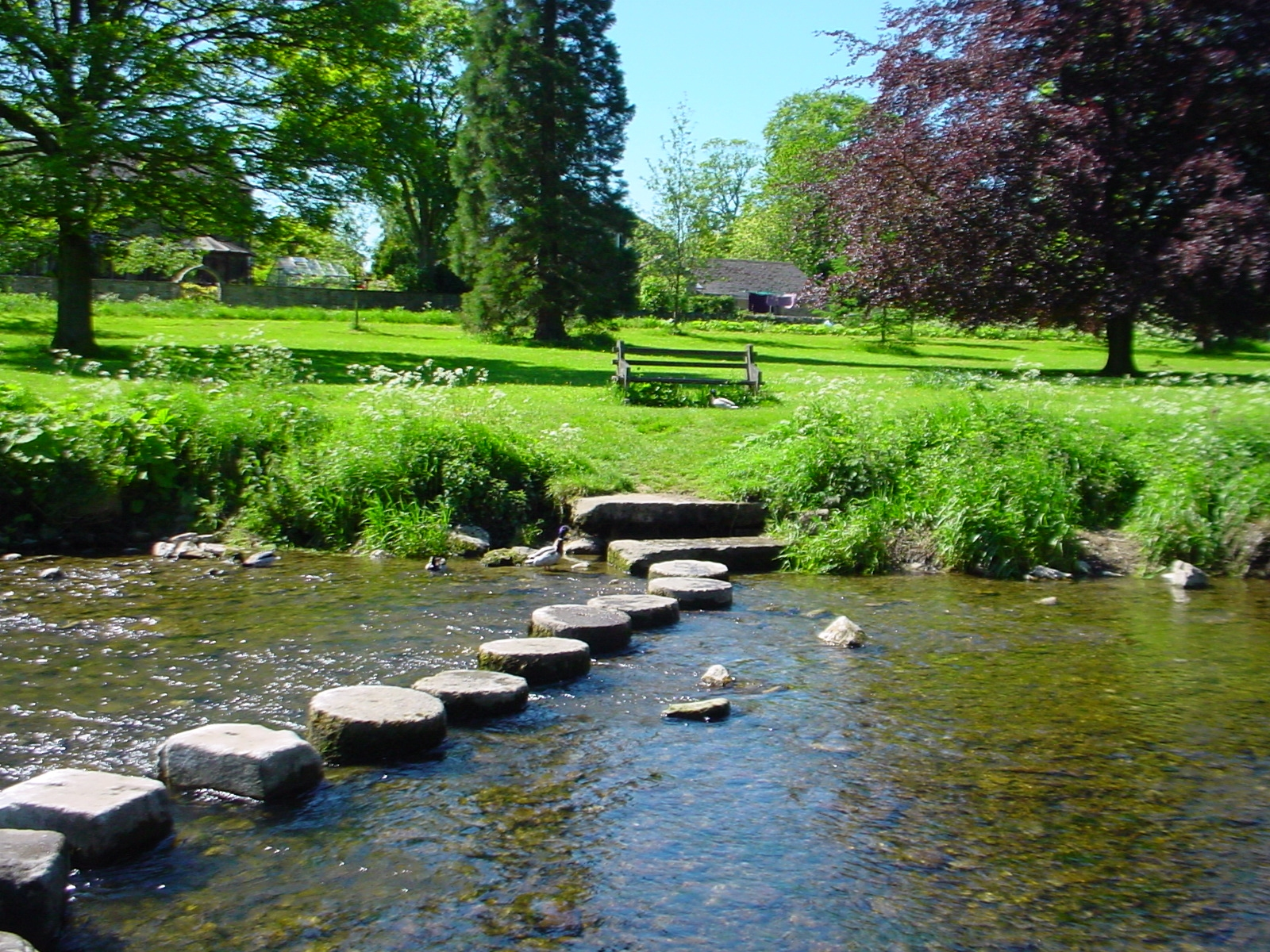
Stepping stones at Gargrave

Gargrave is a popular destination for hikers and cyclists; it is on the edge of the Yorkshire Dales National Park and the Pennine Way National Trail passes through the village.

It has a village hall that hosts art exhibitions, tea dances, snooker, lectures, indoor bowls and pantomimes.

=== Sport ===
Gargrave AFC, the village football club, had an A and a B team playing in the Premier Division and Division 1 of the Craven League until 2016, when they withdrew from the league.

The cricket club has first and second team playing in the Craven and District Cricket League.

There is also a snooker club and a bowling club in the village, as well as the Craven Lawn Tennis Club.

Since the turn of the century, there has been a golf society run from the Masons Arms public house in the village.

== Notable people ==
- St Robert of Newminster (c.1100–1159), priest and abbot, was born in Gargrave.
- Adam Osgodby (died 1316), English lawyer and parson of Gargrave.
- Robert Shute (died April 1590), English judge and politician, was born in Gargrave.
- Robert Story (1795–1860), known as "the Craven Poet", lived in Gargrave.
- The Rt Hon Iain Macleod (1913–1970), British politician and government minister, is buried in Gargrave churchyard.
- The Rt Rev'd Ian Harland (1932–2008), former Bishop of Lancaster and Carlisle, retired to Gargrave in 2000.
- Julian Sands, actor, spent his childhood in Gargrave.

== See also ==
- Listed buildings in Gargrave
