= Eshton =

Village and civil parish in North Yorkshire, England

Coordinates: 54°00′04″N 2°05′58″W

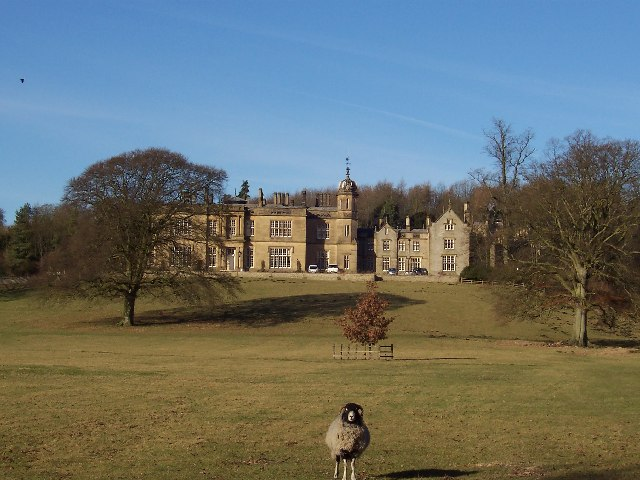
Eshton Hall, a stately home now converted into apartments

Eshton is a small village and civil parish in the county of North Yorkshire, England. At the 2011 Census the population was less than 100 and is included in the civil parish of Flasby with Winterburn. In 2015, North Yorkshire County Council estimated the population to be 70. It is in the Yorkshire Dales and about 6 miles (9.7 km) south of Grassington.

Until 1974 it was part of the West Riding of Yorkshire. From 1974 to 2023 it was part of the Craven District, it is now administered by the unitary North Yorkshire Council.

Eshton Hall is a large grade II* listed country house, built in 1825–7 by architect George Webster of Kendal in an Elizabethan revival style for Matthew Wilson.

== See also ==
- Listed buildings in Eshton
