= Old Swan, Rhayader =

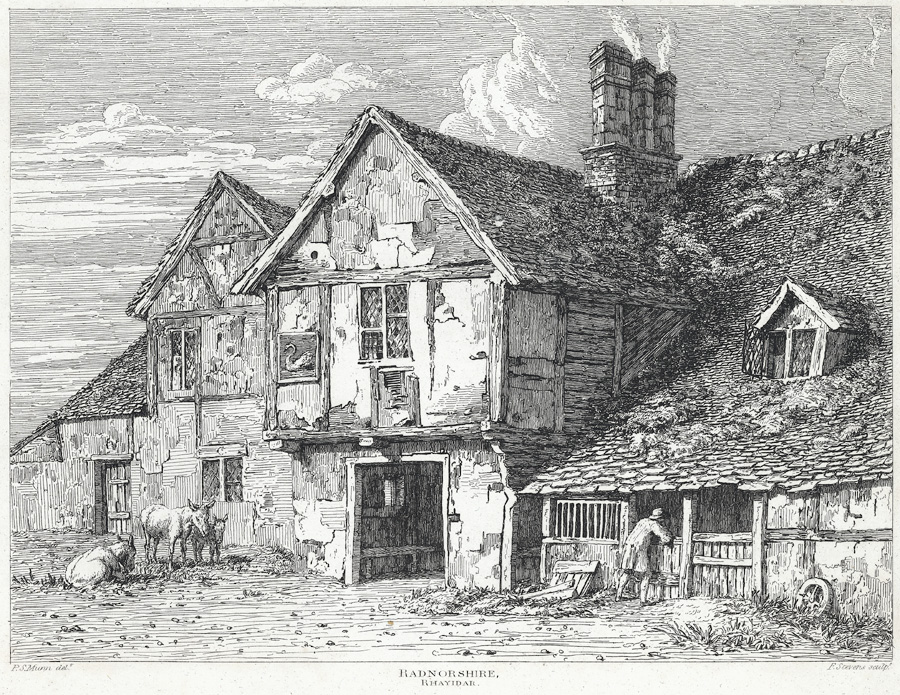
- The Old Swan, Rhayader

- Location in Radnorshire
- 52.2999°N 3.5092°W
- Location: West Street on the corner at the cross roads
- OS grid reference: SJ 297096267983

History
- Built: Late 16th or earlier

Site notes
- Architectural style: Timber framed Storied porch.

Listed Building – Grade II
- Designated: 31 July 1995
- Reference no.: Cadw 16191

The Old Swan is a former historic public house at the centre of Rhayader, Powys, Wales. The buildings are timber framed and while there is a datestone of 1683, it is very probable that it is late 16th century, if not earlier. The buildings still have their original roof of stone flags and distinctive leaning stone chimney stacks. The buildings were listed Grade II in 1995.

== History and architecture ==
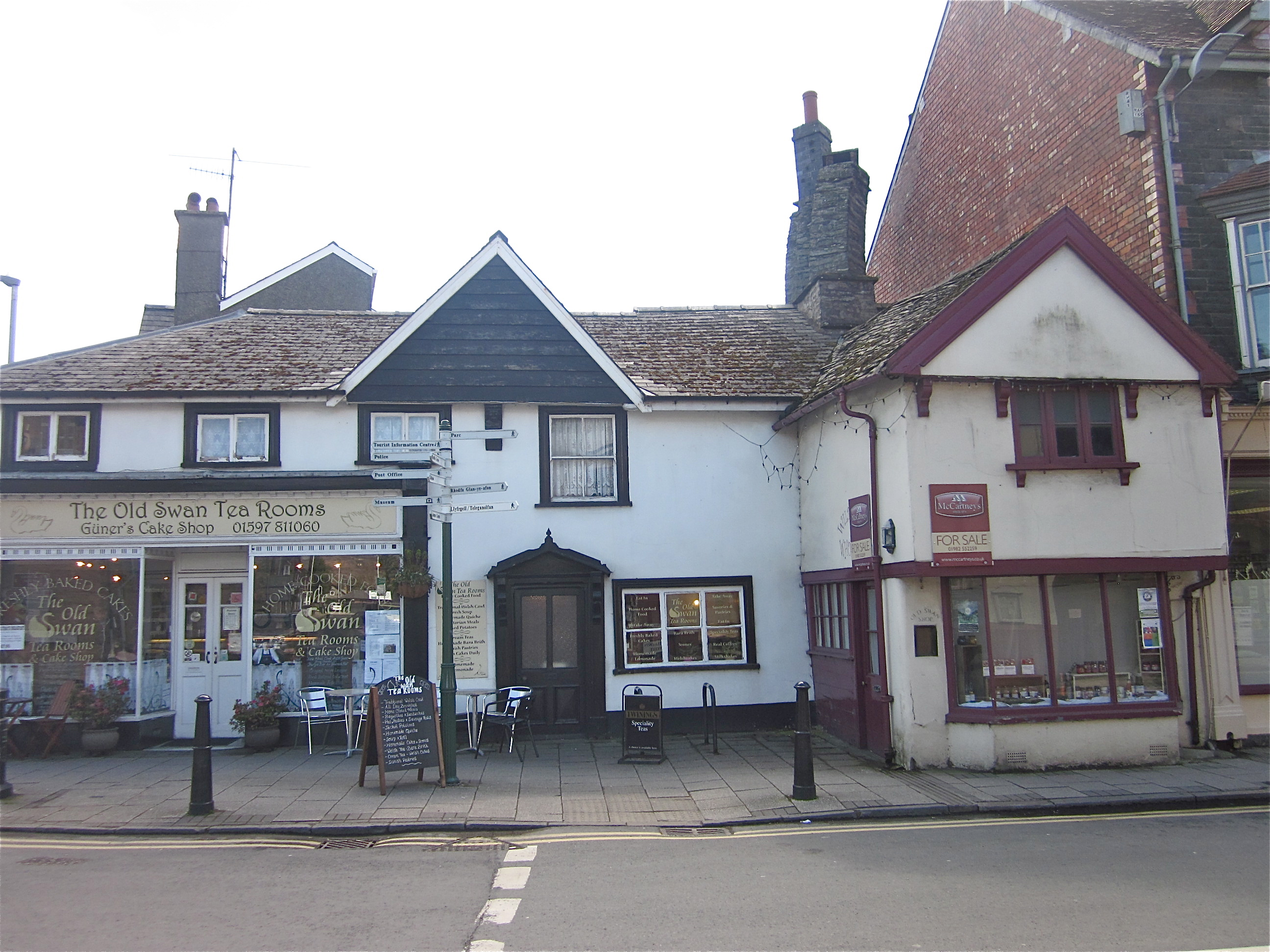
Old Swan, Rhayader

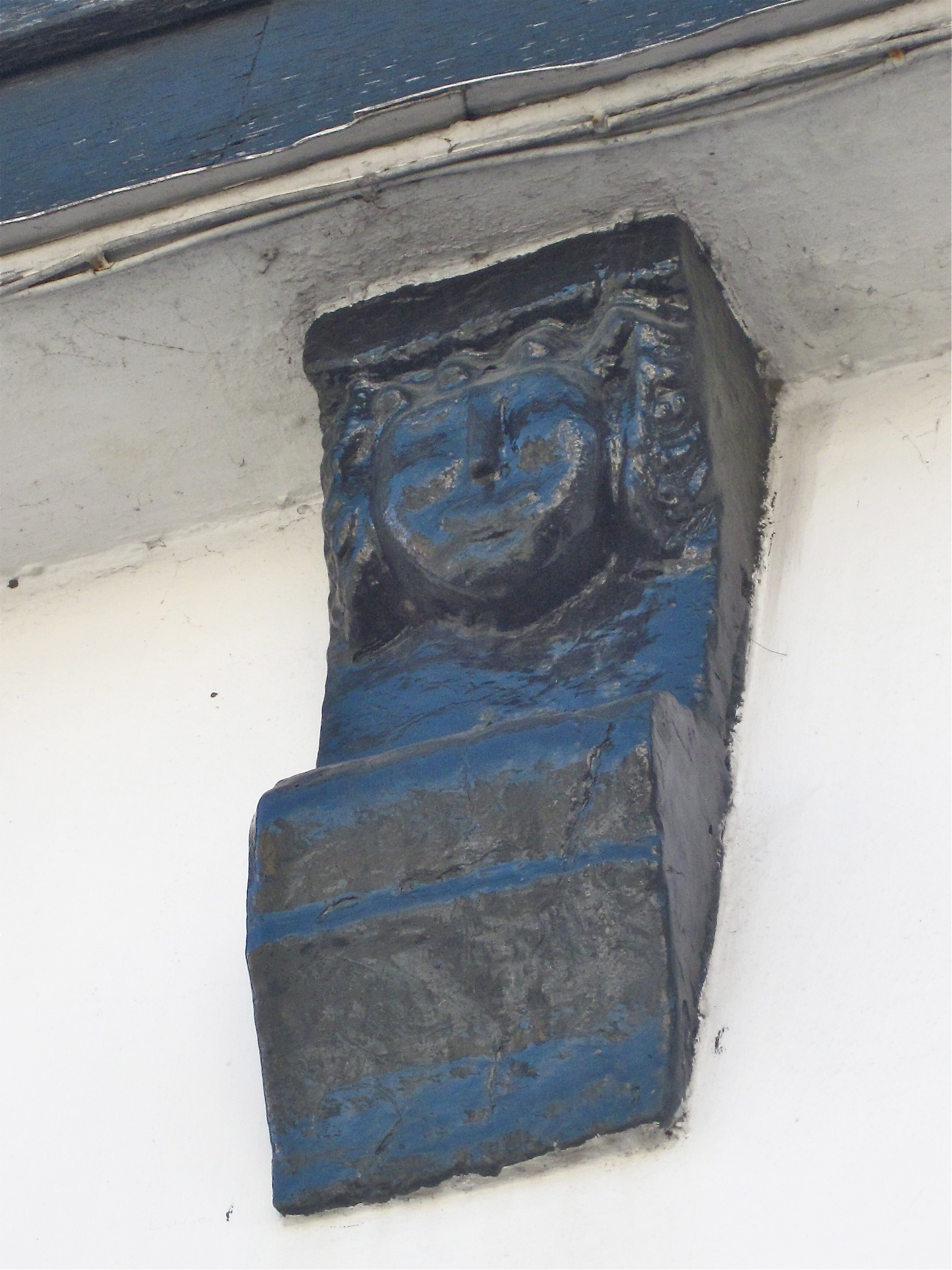
Old Swan, Lady with Medieval headdress

The Old Swan, stands on the corner of West and South Streets Rhayader. The original building was mentioned in 1676 as being one of the two inns in Rhayader at that date. Some changes were made in 1683, including the rebuilding of the three chimney stacks, and this date is carved into the old timbers inside the building. During the 1860s the Old Swan stopped trading as an inn, and it was used in later years as a hardware shop, a saddlers, a butcher's shop, and other businesses. Part of it was used as a Tourist Information Office for a time, and the section of the building on the corner is used as a teashop. The earliest depiction of the Old Swan is an engraving of 1815 by the artist Paul Sandby Munn. The engraving shows a porch that has been jettied forward at first floor level with a sign showing a swan. The building on the left, which appears to be a stable and clearly shows the Flagstone covered roof. The engraving shows the three stone chimney stacks on the west side of the porch roof, but as to-day they are on the east side, this must be a mistake by the artist. The open porch has now been replaced by a shop window. On the east side there is gable and to-day there is a wooden bracket showing the head of a woman with a ‘‘horned’’, late Medieval headress set into the gable.

=== Literature ===
- Brooksby, H. (1972) ‘’Houses of Radnorshire, Part 5," in Transactions of the Radnorshire Society pp 41–43.
- Scourfield R and Haslam R,( 2013) Buildings of Wales: Powys; Montgomeryshire, Radnorshire and Breconshire, 2nd edition, Yale University Press
- Peter Smith, Houses of the Welsh Countryside, Royal Commission on the Ancient and Historical Monuments of Wales, 2nd edition, 1988.
- Suggett R and Stevenson G., Introducing Houses of the Welsh Countryside, Y Lolfa, 2010.

== Old Swan Gallery ==
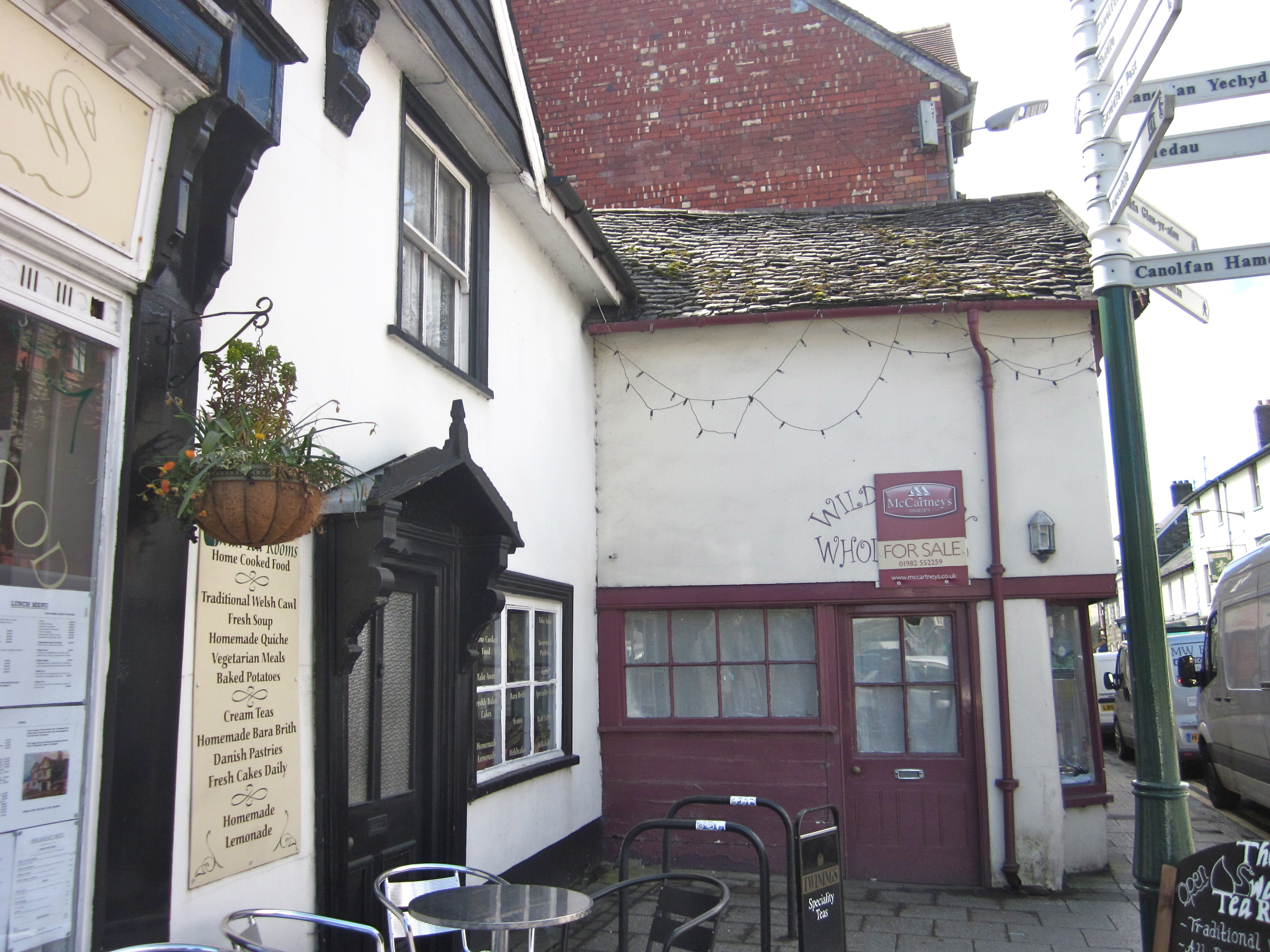
Old Swan, Rhayader

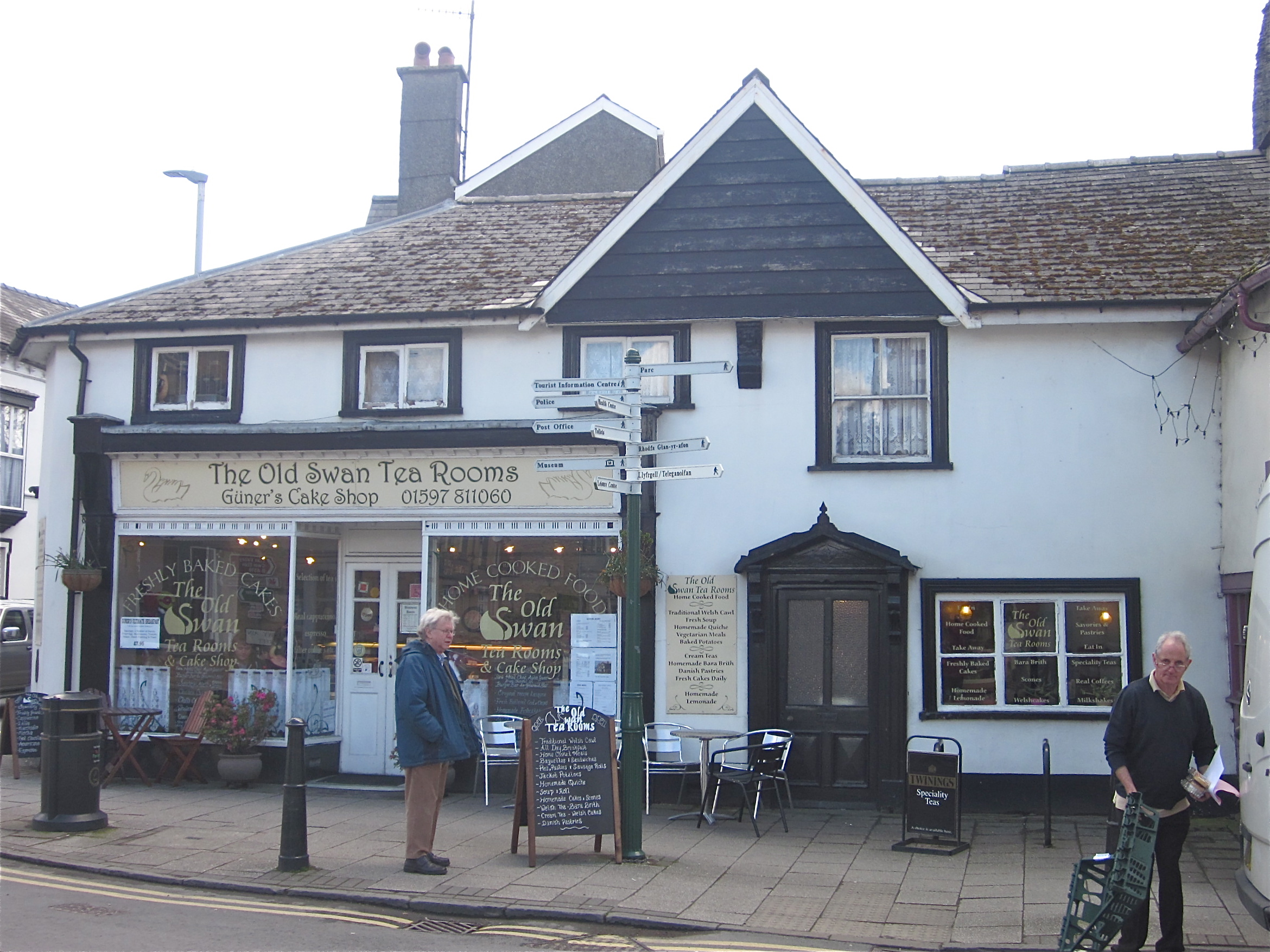
Old Swan, Rhayader

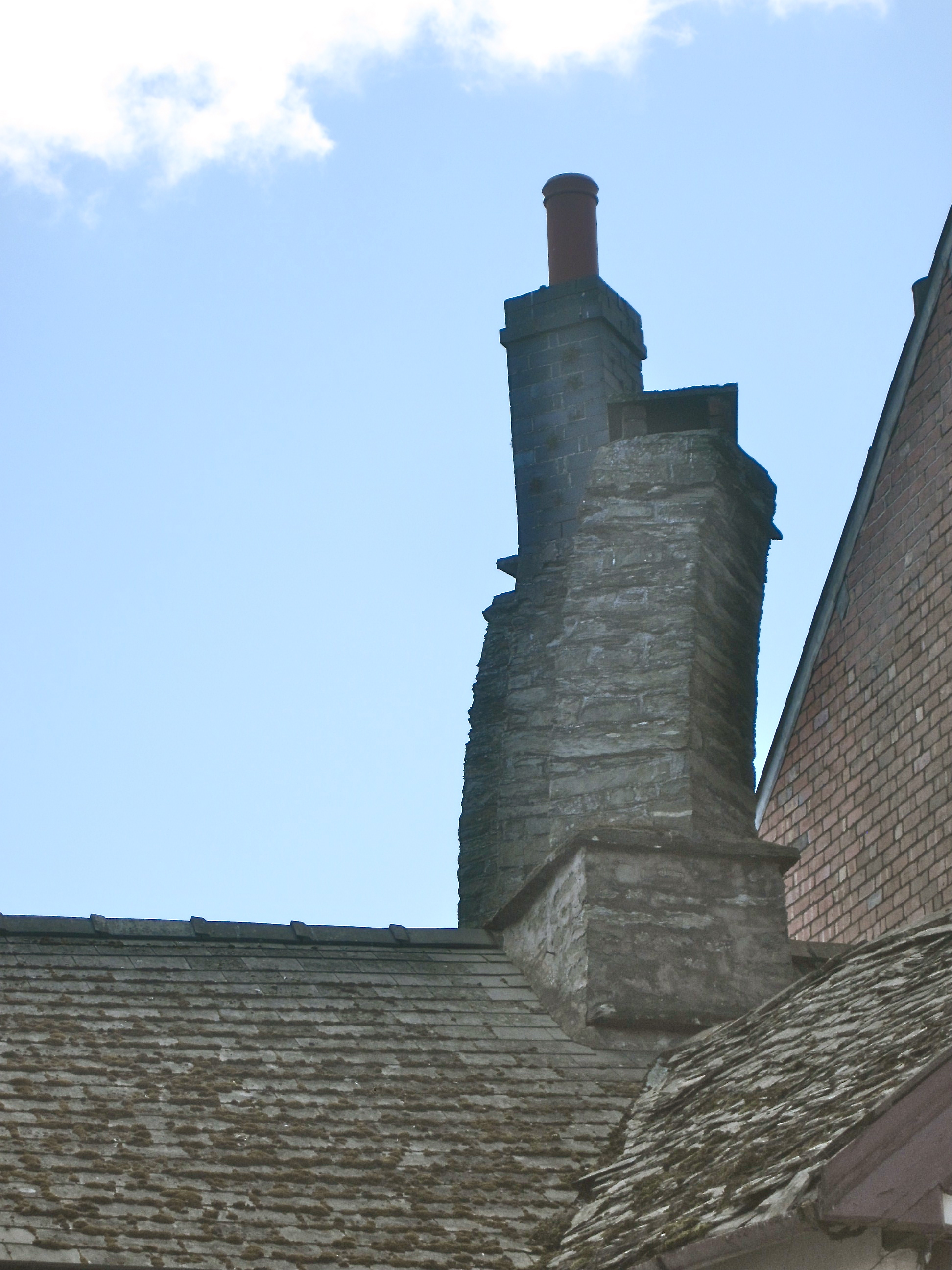
Old Swan, Rhayader Leaning chimney stacks.

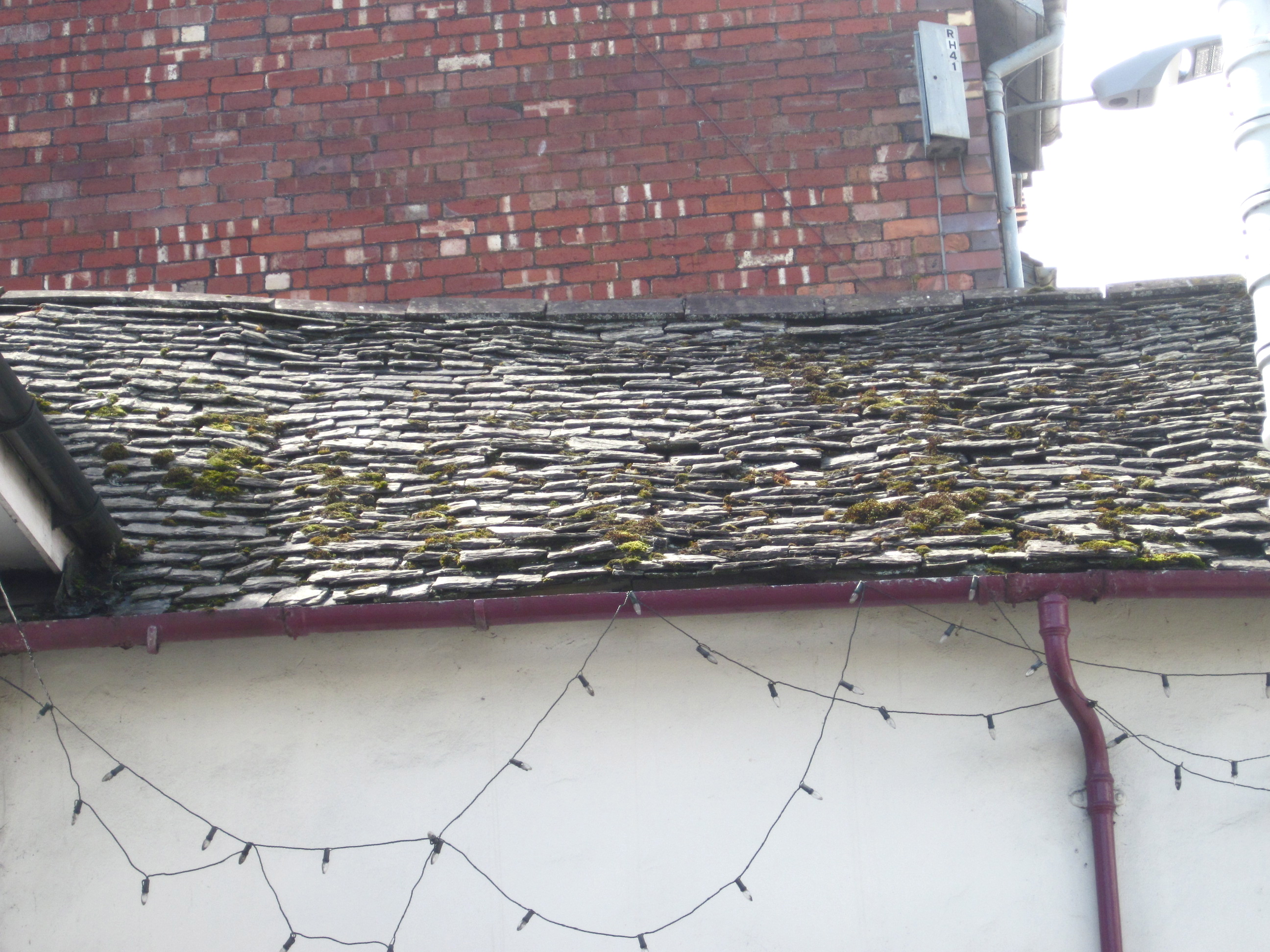
Old Swan, Rhayader showing flagstone roofing

=== External links ===
- Powys Digital History Project : Rhayader
