= St Andrew's Church, Gargrave =

Church in North Yorkshire, England

Coordinates: 53.9812°N 2.1052°W

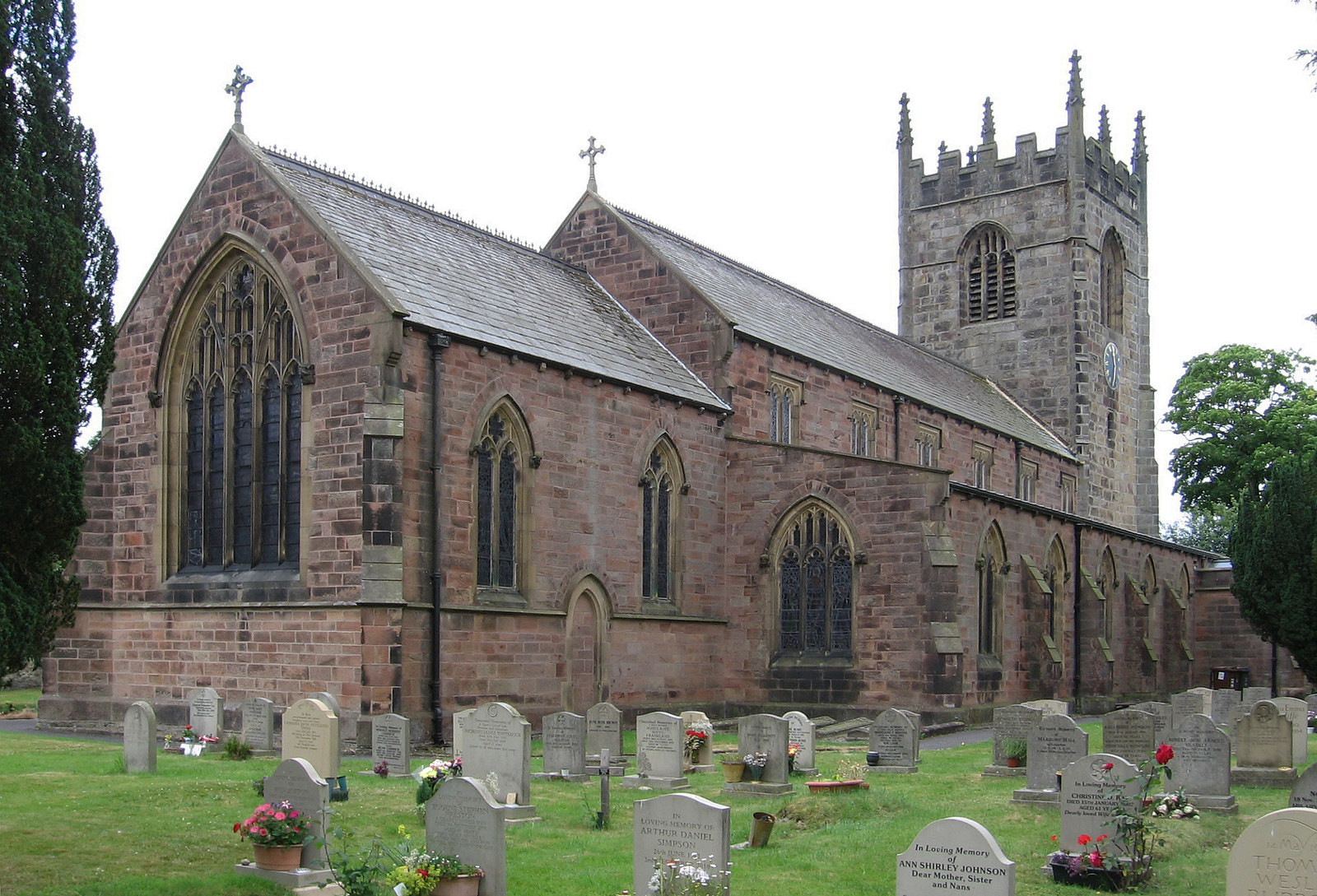
The church, in 2013

St Andrew's Church is the parish church of Gargrave, a village in North Yorkshire, in England.

The church was probably originally built in the 16th century, from which period the tower survives. In 1674, the vicar demolished the large rood screen, which doubled as an organ loft. Unfortunately, the screen also played a structural role, and the action caused part of the roof to collapse, and the south aisle to become unusable. It was repaired, but the bulk of the building was later demolished and rebuilt in 1852 by Rhode Hawkins, in the Perpendicular style. It was grade II listed in 1954.

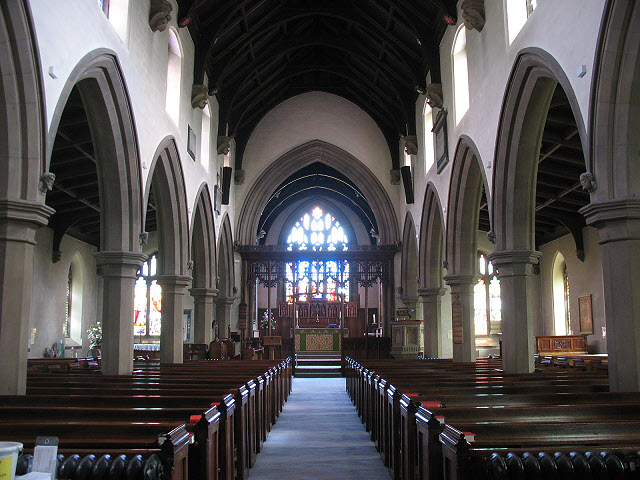
Looking towards the chancel, in 2009

The church is built of sandstone, yellowish in the tower, and red elsewhere, the aisle and tower have lead roofs, and the roofs elsewhere are in green slate. The church consists of a nave with a clerestory, north and south aisles, north and south porches, a chancel, and a west tower. The tower has diagonal buttresses, a three-light west window, above which is a niche, three-light bell openings, and an embattled parapet with eight crocketed pinnacles. Seven windows in the chancel have stained glass by Jean-Baptiste Capronnier.

== See also ==
- Listed buildings in Gargrave
