= Old Swan, Gargrave =

Historic public house in Gargrave, North Yorkshire, England

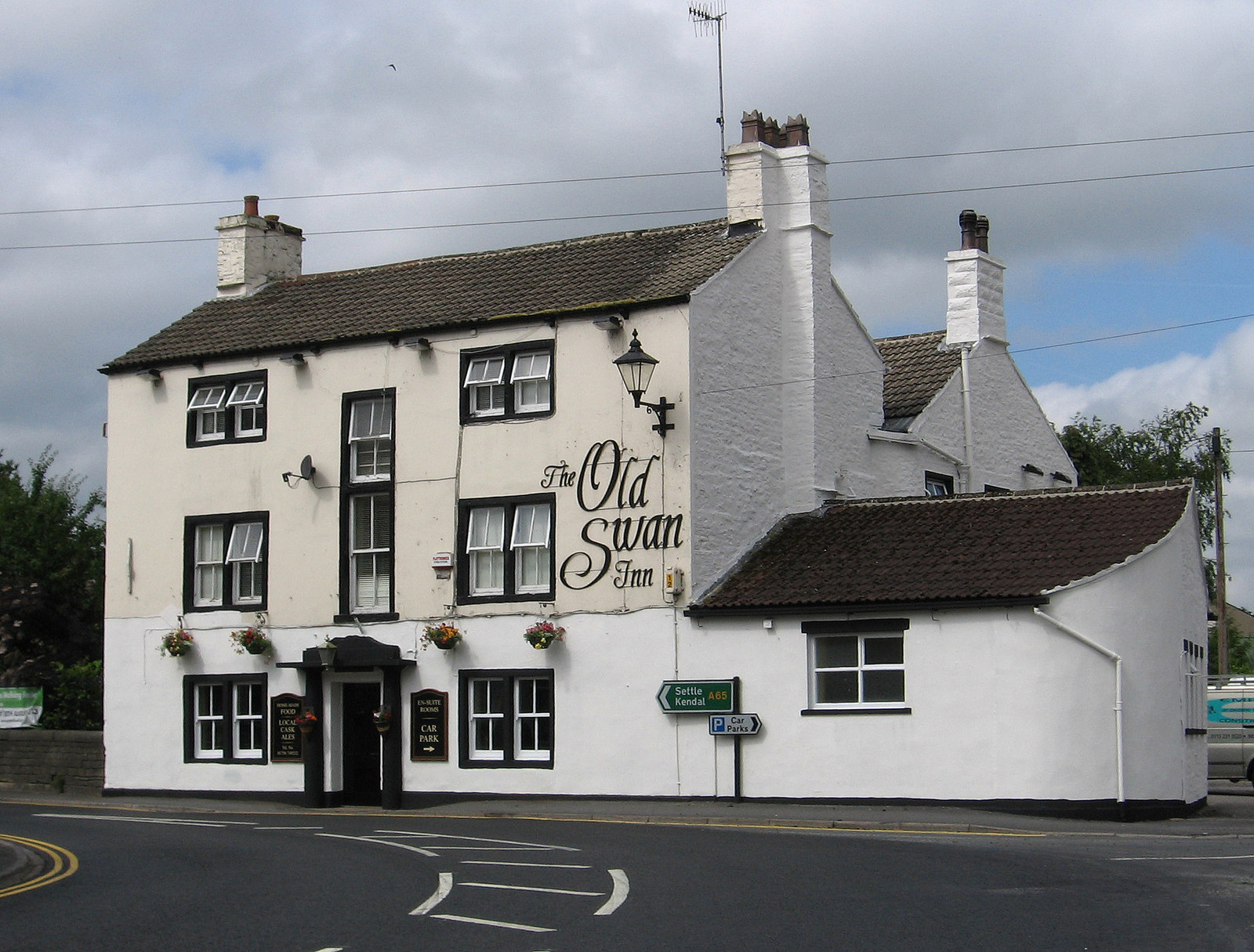
The pub, in 2013

The Old Swan is a historic public house in Gargrave, a village in North Yorkshire, in England.

The pub was built in either the 18th century, or the early 19th century. It was grade II listed in 1989. In 2020, the landlord attempted to burn down the building, and had to be rescued from the roof of the building while it was in flames. It was restored at a cost of £400,000 and reopened in 2022, under the ownership of the Stonegate Pub Company.

The pub is rendered and has a concrete tile roof. It has three storeys and is three bays wide. The central doorway has engaged Doric columns carrying a hood. Above the doorway is a tall stair window, and the other windows are mullioned with two lights.

== See also ==
- Listed buildings in Gargrave
