= Flasby =

Hamlet in North Yorkshire, England

Coordinates: 54.0060°N 2.0839°W

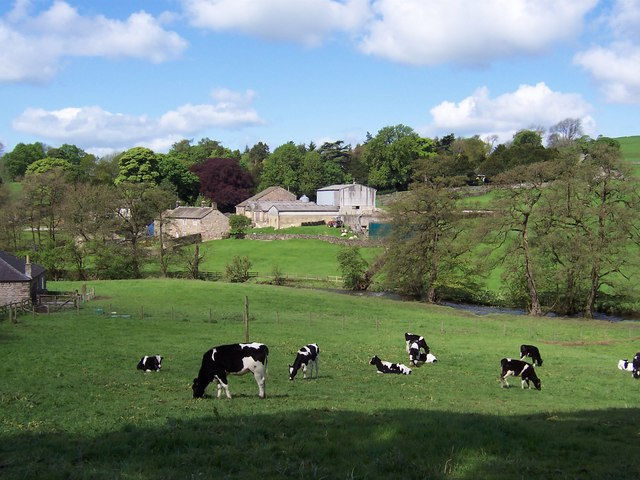

- Location within North Yorkshire
- Population: 207 (Including Calton and Eshton. 2011 census)
- OS grid reference: SD946566
- Civil parish: Flasby with Winterburn
- Unitary authority: North Yorkshire
- Ceremonial county: North Yorkshire
- Region: Yorkshire and the Humber
- Country: England
- Sovereign state: United Kingdom
- Post town: SKIPTON
- Postcode district: BD23
- Dialling code: 01756
- Police: North Yorkshire
- Fire: North Yorkshire
- Ambulance: Yorkshire
- UK Parliament: Skipton and Ripon

Flasby is a hamlet in the Yorkshire Dales in North Yorkshire, England. It is one of the two settlements, with Winterburn, in the civil parish of Flasby with Winterburn. The population of the civil parish was estimated at 80 in 2012, measured at 207 in the 2011 Census.

Flasby was first mentioned, as Flatebi, in the Domesday Book of 1086. The toponym is of Old Norse origin, meaning "the farmstead of a man called Flat" (the same origin as Flaxby).

Flasby with Winterburn was a township in the ancient parish of Gargrave in Staincliffe Wapentake in the West Riding of Yorkshire. It became a separate civil parish in 1866, and was transferred to the new county of North Yorkshire in 1974. From 1974 to 2023 it was part of the Craven District, it is now administered by the unitary North Yorkshire Council.

Flasby Hall is a large house built in 1843–44 and a Grade II listed building. In 1848 the Flasby Sword, an Iron Age sword and scabbard, was discovered in the grounds. It is now in the Craven Museum & Gallery in Skipton.

Freddie Trueman, the Yorkshire cricketer, lived in the village for many years.

== See also ==
- Listed buildings in Flasby with Winterburn
