= Eshton Hall =

House in Eshton, North Yorkshire, England

Coordinates: 54.0000°N 2.0964°W

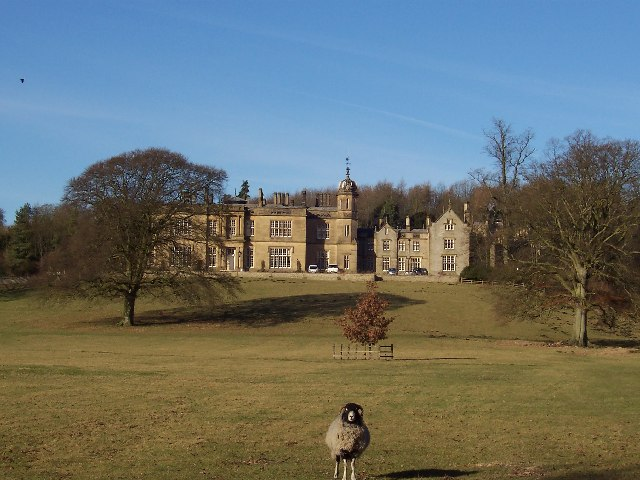
The hall, in 2006

Eshton Hall is a historic building in Eshton, a village in North Yorkshire, in England.

The country house was constructed between 1825 and 1827, for Mathew Wilson, replacing a Georgian house in the Palladian style. It was designed by George Webster, and was one of the earliest works in the Elizabethan Revival style. Webster altered and extended the building between 1835 and 1839, and the house then remained largely unchanged, the only substantial alterations being to the service wing. The house had 30 acres (12 ha) of pleasure grounds, on both sides of Eshton Beck.

Eston Hall was inherited by Frances Mary Richardson Currer who held a large library. During World War I, the building housed Westlands School, then it became a private home before housing Bramcote School during World War II. In 1946, the new Eshton Hall School was set up in the building, and in 1959 it purchased the freehold from the Wilson family. The school closed in 1966, and the building was converted into a nursing home. In 2005, it was converted into 18 apartments, with work including several new staircases, and a new roof covering. The house was grade II* listed in 1954.

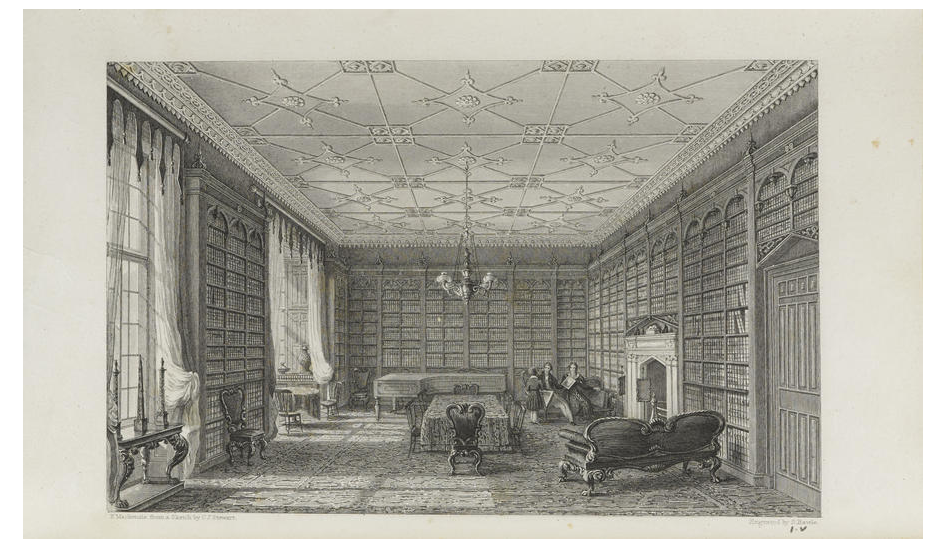
The library, in 1833

The hall is built of stone with slate roofs. The main block has two storeys and fronts of five bays, the outer bays on the main front projecting, with a continuous coped parapet. On the front is a two-storey porch with coupled Doric antae and ornamental cresting. The windows are mullioned and transomed and contain horizontally-sliding sashes. To the right of the main block is an octagonal turret, with three stages, a scalloped crest, an ogee lead cupola, and a dated and initialled weathervane. Further to the right is a service wing with two storeys and nine bays, containing a gabled gatehouse with an oriel window and a gabled bellcote. Inside, there is a central staircase under a lantern, while the dining room, library, and drawing room all have marble fireplaces.

== See also ==
- Grade II* listed buildings in North Yorkshire (district)
- Listed buildings in Eshton
