= Winterburn =

Village in North Yorkshire, England

Coordinates: 54°01′24″N 2°06′05″W

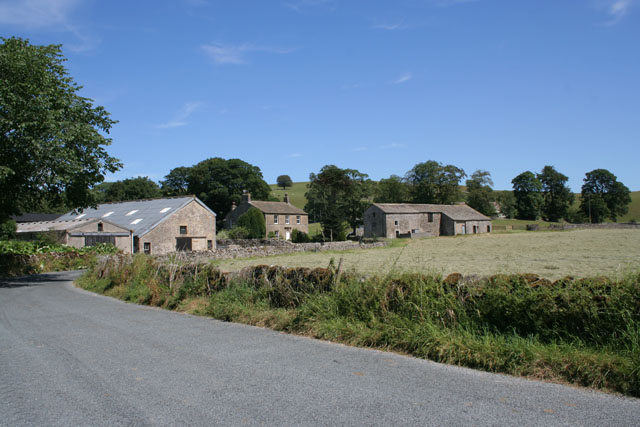
- Winterburn Hall Farm, some buildings of which date from the 18th century

- Location within North Yorkshire
- OS grid reference: SD934587
- Civil parish: Flasby with Winterburn
- Unitary authority: North Yorkshire
- Ceremonial county: North Yorkshire
- Region: Yorkshire and the Humber
- Country: England
- Sovereign state: United Kingdom
- Post town: SKIPTON
- Postcode district: BD23
- Police: North Yorkshire
- Fire: North Yorkshire
- Ambulance: Yorkshire

Winterburn is a village in the county of North Yorkshire, England. It is about 5 miles (8 km) south west of Grassington.

Winterburn Reservoir is located about a mile from the village, which is situated on Winterburn Beck, the reservoir's outlet.

Friars Head Hall lies in the village, on a site formerly occupied by a grange of Furness Abbey.

Until 1974 it was part of the West Riding of Yorkshire. From 1974 to 2023 it was part of the Craven District, it is now administered by the unitary North Yorkshire Council.

== See also ==
- Listed buildings in Flasby with Winterburn
