= Ralph Assheton =

Ralph Assheton may refer to:

- Sir Ralph de Ashton or Assheton (fl. 1421–1486), 15th century nobleman, also known as 'The Black Knight'
- Ralph Assheton (died 1559), MP for Liverpool (UK Parliament constituency)
- Ralph Assheton (general) (1596–1650), MP for Lancashire
- Sir Ralph Assheton, 2nd Baronet, of Lever (c. 1605–1680), MP for Clitheroe
- Sir Ralph Assheton, 2nd Baronet, of Middleton (1652–1716), MP for Liverpool and Lancashire
- Ralph Assheton (1830–1907), MP for Clitheroe
- Sir Ralph Assheton, 1st Baronet (1860–1955)
- Ralph Assheton, 1st Baron Clitheroe (1901–1984), Conservative Party politician and MP
- Ralph Assheton, 2nd Baron Clitheroe (born 1929)

It may also refer to one of their many ancestors named Ralph Assheton: see Assheton baronets
