= Assheton (surname) =

Assheton is a surname, and may refer to:

- Abdias Assheton (1563–1633), English clergyman
- Barry Assheton-Smith (1905–1978), South African cricketer
- John Assheton (fl.1548), Anglican priest
- John Assheton I (c.1354–c.1398), English military commander and Member of Parliament for Lancashire
- Sir John Assheton II (died 1428), English soldier and Member of Parliament for Lancashire, son of the above
- Nicholas Assheton (1590–1625), English writer
- Ralph Assheton (general) (1596–1650), Member of Parliament for Lancashire
- Sir Ralph Assheton, 2nd Baronet, of Lever (c. 1605–1680), Member of Parliament for Clitheroe
- Sir Ralph Assheton, 2nd Baronet, of Middleton (1652–1716), Member of Parliament for Liverpool and Lancashire
- Ralph Assheton (1830–1907), Member of Parliament for Clitheroe
- Sir Ralph Assheton, 1st Baronet (1860–1955), English public official
- Ralph Assheton, 1st Baron Clitheroe (1901–1984), Conservative Party politician and Member of Parliament
- Ralph Assheton, 2nd Baron Clitheroe (1929–2026), English businessman and public official
- Richard Assheton (died 1579), Member of Parliament for Aldborough and Carlisle
- Richard Assheton of Middleton, 16th-century soldier and landowner
- R. R. G. (Rowland) Assheton, architect, designer of the Grand Picture Theatre in Adelaide, Australia (opened 1916)
- Thomas Assheton Smith I (1752–1828), English landowner and all-round sportsman
- Thomas Assheton Smith II (1776–1858), English landowner and all-round sportsman
- William Assheton (1641–1711), English cleric

== See also ==
- Ashton (surname)
