= Assheton =

Assheton (pronounced Ashton) is an English name deriving from Ashton-under-Lyne (formerly spelt Assheton or Asheton). It may refer to:

== Given name ==
- Assheton Curzon, 1st Viscount Curzon (1730–1820), British Tory politician
- Sir Assheton Curzon-Howe (1850–1911), British naval officer
- Assheton Gorton (1930–2014), English production designer
- Assheton Pownall (priest) (1823–1886), Archdeacon of Leicester
- Sir Assheton Pownall (1877–1953), British Tory politician

== Surname ==
- Assheton (surname)

== See also ==
- Assheton baronets
- Assheton-Smith baronets
