= Downham, Lancashire =

Village in Lancashire, England

Coordinates: 53.893°N 2.327°W

Downham
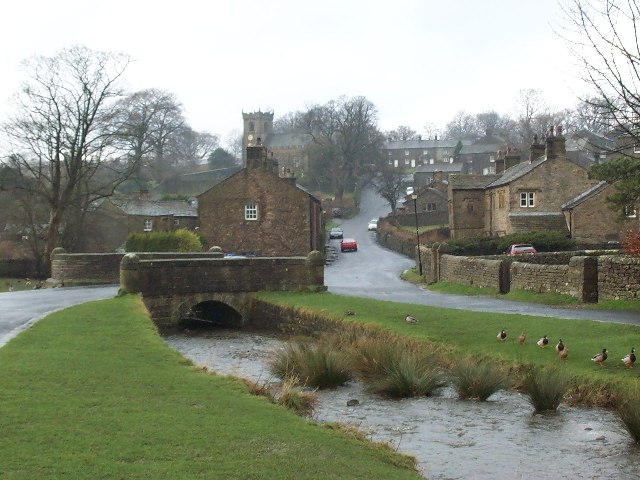
- The village with the bridge crossing Downham Beck

- Location in Ribble Valley Borough Location in the Forest of Bowland Location within Lancashire
- Population: 214 (2011 Census)
- OS grid reference: SD785442
- Civil parish: Downham
- District: Ribble Valley
- Shire county: Lancashire
- Region: North West
- Country: England
- Sovereign state: United Kingdom
- Post town: CLITHEROE
- Postcode district: BB7
- Dialling code: 01200
- Police: Lancashire
- Fire: Lancashire
- Ambulance: North West
- UK Parliament: Ribble Valley

Downham /ˈdaʊnəm/ is a village and civil parish in Lancashire, England. It is in the Ribble Valley district and at the United Kingdom 2001 census had a population of 156. The 2011 Census includes neighbouring Twiston giving a total for both parishes of 214. The village is on the north side of Pendle Hill off the A59 road about 3 miles (4.8 km) from Clitheroe. Much of the parish, including the village is part of the Forest of Bowland Area of Outstanding Natural Beauty (AONB). It adjoins the Ribble Valley parishes of Rimington, Twiston, Worston, Chatburn and Sawley, and the Pendle parish of Barley-with-Wheatley Booth.

== History ==
The manor was originally granted to the de Dinelay family in the fourteenth century by Henry of Grosmont, 1st Duke of Lancaster. It ceased to be a part of the Honour of Clitheroe in 1558 when it was purchased by the Assheton family. It still remains in Assheton ownership today but was reincorporated into the Honour of Clitheroe in 1945 when Ralph Assheton, later 1st Baron Clitheroe, bought the remnants of the Honour from the administrators of the Clitheroe Estate Company.

The 2nd Lord Clitheroe does not allow overhead electricity lines, aerials or satellite dishes, making the village a popular location for filming period dramas. Downham was one of the locations used in the 1961 film Whistle Down the Wind, and the BBC One series Born and Bred, set in the fictional village of Ormston, was also filmed in the village. The 2012 BBC drama The Secret of Crickley Hall was also filmed in and around Downham.

== Governance ==
Downham was once a township in the ancient parish of Whalley. This became a civil parish in 1866, forming part of the Clitheroe Rural District from 1894 till 1974.

Along with Chatburn and Twiston, the parish makes up the Chatburn ward of Ribble Valley Borough Council.

== Media gallery ==
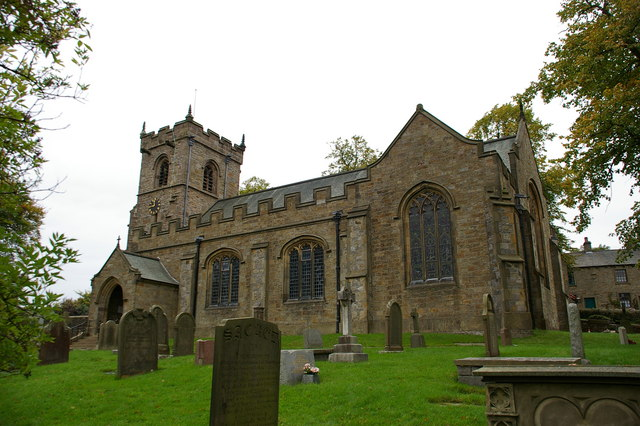
St Leonard's Church

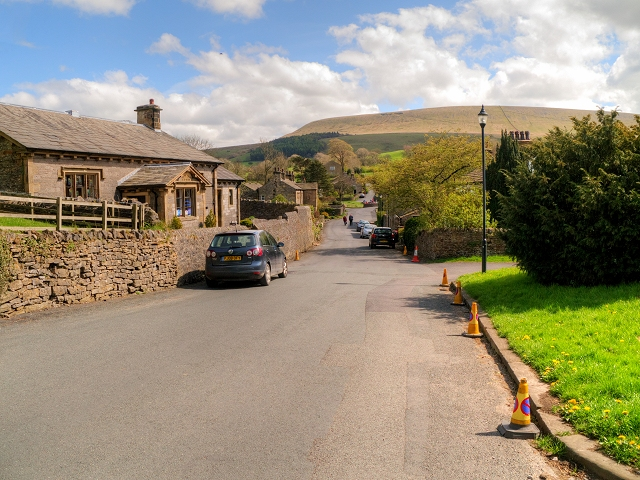
Former Downham School with Pendle Hill in the background

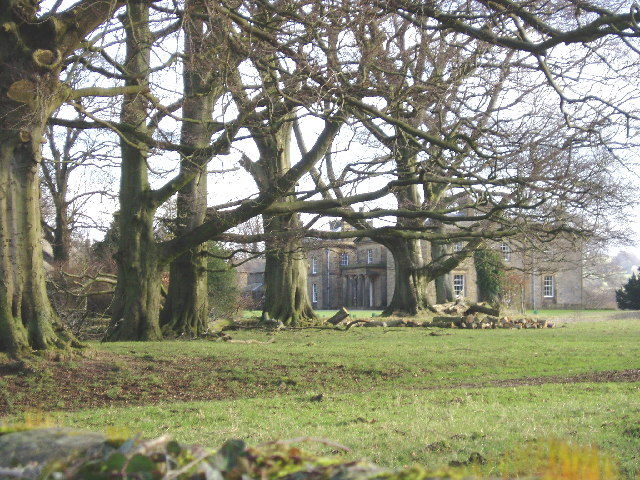
Downham Hall

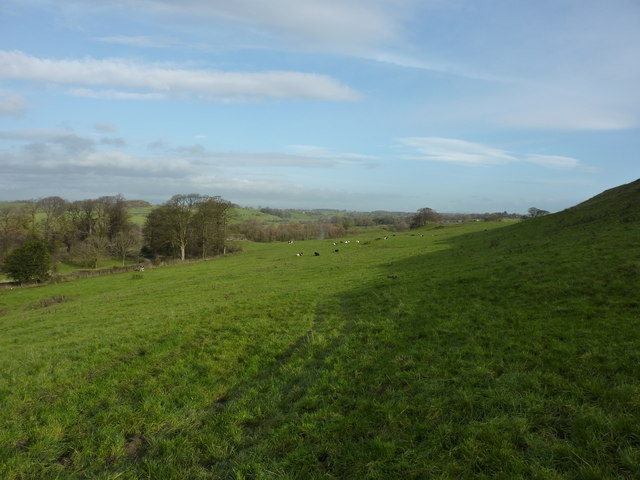
Downham Green

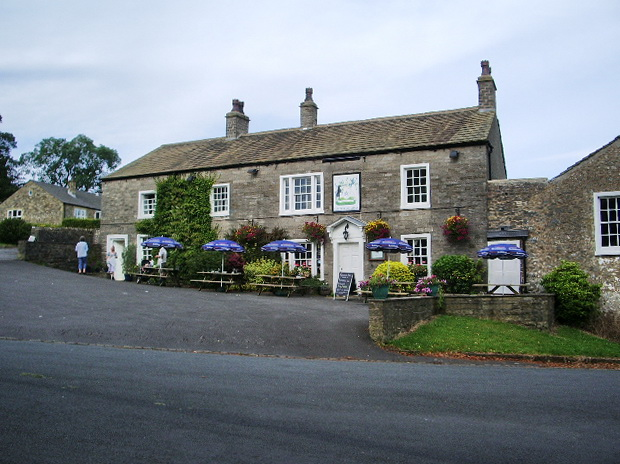
The Assheton Arms

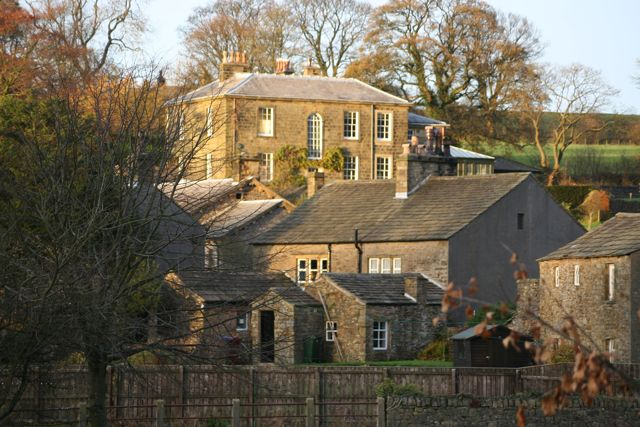
A view of the village with the Lidgett House in the background

== See also ==
- Assheton baronets
- Honour of Clitheroe
- Listed buildings in Downham, Lancashire
