= Duke William Inn =

Listed pub in Ainsworth, Greater Manchester, England

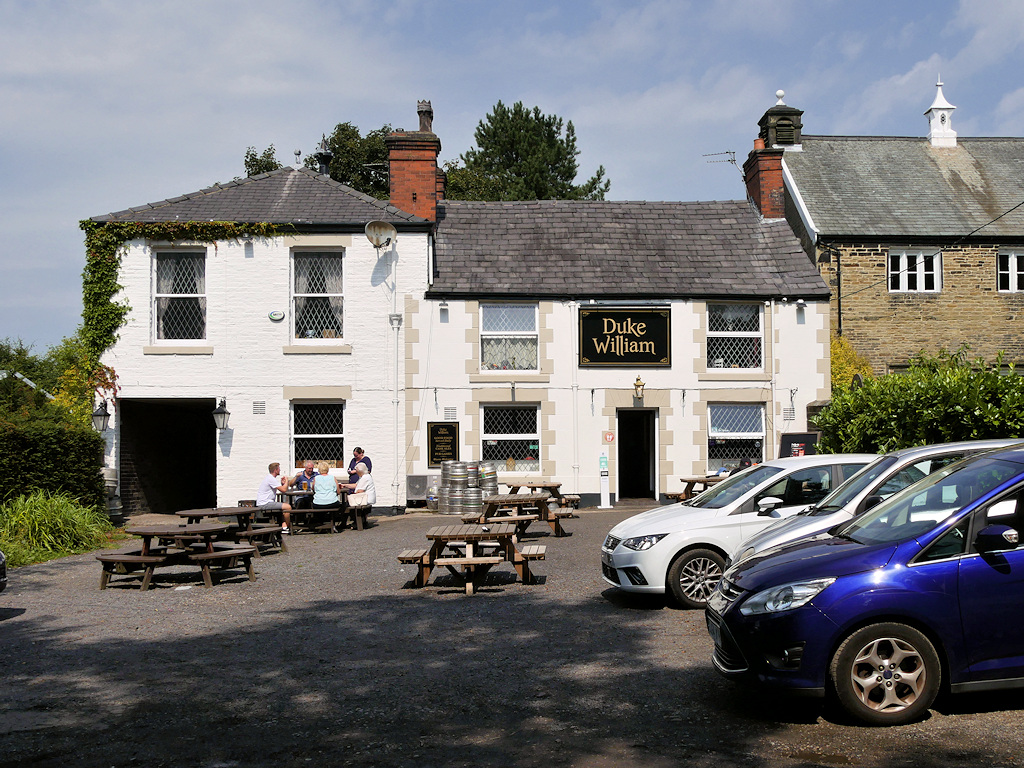
- The pub in 2020

- Location within Greater Manchester
- Alternative names: Duke William

General information
- Type: Public house
- Location: 1A Well Street, Ainsworth, Greater Manchester, England
- Coordinates: 53.5888°N 2.3598°W
- Year built: 1737; 289 years ago

Design and construction
- Designations

Listed Building – Grade II
- Official name: Duke William Inn
- Designated: 29 January 1985
- Reference no.: 1164029

The Duke William Inn is a Grade II listed public house on Well Street in Ainsworth, a village near Radcliffe within the Metropolitan Borough of Bury, Greater Manchester, England. Although dated 1737, it was likely a remodel of an older building and has been subsequently changed.

== History ==
The building carries a "1737" date, but it was probably a reworking of an earlier structure and was altered again later, according to its official listing. Initially founded as a coaching inn, it was subsequently used as the local coroner's court in the 1800s. The 1893 Ordnance Survey map marks the building as the Duke William Inn.

On 29 January 1985, the Duke William Inn was designated a Grade II listed building. It stands close to the Grade II* listed Presbyterian Chapel, another historic building in the village.

== Architecture ==
The building has a symmetrical front and is constructed of painted stone. It has two storeys with two large, widely spaced sash windows, and a sign panel above the doorway. The corners and window surrounds are picked out with plain stonework, and the doorway has a stepped stone feature above it. The roof has a stone gutter and is covered with slate. A date stone above the rear door may read "1662".

Behind the main building is a former stable, probably from the 18th century, built of handmade red brick with stone gable ends, corner stones, and a stone‑slab roof. A later two‑storey extension to the left, built of rubble stone and taller than the original structure, is not considered of special interest.

== See also ==
- Listed buildings in Radcliffe, Greater Manchester
- Listed pubs in Greater Manchester
