= St Leonard's Church, Downham =

Coordinates: 53.8945°N 2.3297°W

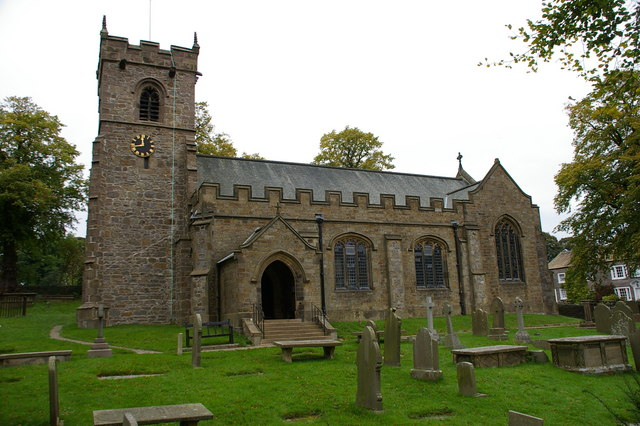
- St Leonard's Church, Downham, from the south

- Location in the Borough of Ribble Valley
- OS grid reference: SD 784 443
- Location: Downham, Lancashire
- Country: England
- Denomination: Anglican
- Website: St Leonard, Downham

History
- Status: Parish church
- Dedication: Saint Leonard

Architecture
- Functional status: Active
- Heritage designation: Grade II*
- Designated: 13 February 1967
- Architect: Mervyn Macartney (rebuilding)
- Architectural type: Church
- Style: Gothic, Gothic Revival
- Groundbreaking: 15th century
- Completed: 1910

Specifications
- Materials: Sandstone, slate roof

Administration
- Province: York
- Diocese: Blackburn
- Archdeaconry: Blackburn
- Deanery: Whalley
- Parish: St Leonard, Downham

Clergy
- Vicar: Revd Dr Judith Clark

St Leonard's Church is in the village of Downham, Lancashire, England. It is an active Anglican parish church in the diocese of Blackburn. The tower dates from the 15th century, and the rest of the church was rebuilt in 1909–10. The church is recorded in the National Heritage List for England as a designated Grade II* listed building.

== History ==
The oldest part of the church is the west tower, which dates from the 15th century. The rest of the church was rebuilt in 1909–10, and was designed by Mervyn Macartney.

== Architecture ==
=== Exterior ===
The church is built in sandstone with a slate roof. Its plan consists of a nave and chancel under a continuous roof, a south chapel, a north organ chamber, a south aisle, a south porch, and a west tower. The tower has diagonal buttresses, and a west door with a moulded surround and a pointed head. Above it is a three-light window with a Tudor arched head. The window contains Perpendicular tracery. Above the windows the bell openings have two lights and pointed heads, and at the top of the tower is an embattled parapet with corner pinnacles and gargoyles. The windows of the south aisle have three lights, and the eastern bay is gabled. The parapet of the aisle is embattled. The outer and inner doors of the porch have chamfered jambs and pointed arches. The east window has five lights and a Tudor arched head.

=== Interior ===
Inside the church the arcade between the nave and the aisle has three bays and pointed arches. The chancel arch is also pointed and is chamfered. The nave and chancel have barrel roofs. The font is in sandstone, it is octagonal in the style of the 16th century, and on its sides are shields. One shield is carved with the Legs of Man, another with a chevron and three fleur-de-lis, and the others are blank. In the church is a brass chandelier in Baroque shape. The stained glass in the east window was given by Ralph and Richard Assheton of Downham Hall in 1869, and has been re-set by Shrigley and Hunt. Shrigley and Hunt also designed a window depicting Saint Leonard, and dating from the early 20th century. The monuments almost all commemorate members of the Assheton family, and include one by Richard Westmacott to Frances Arabella Assheton, who died in 1835. The two-manual pipe organ was built by Forster and Andrews and moved here from Meols in 1909. There is a ring of five bells. Two of these date from about 1480 and were cast in London. The others were cast by John Taylor & Co, two in 1881 and the other in 1948.

== Associated structures ==
In the churchyard is a sundial dated 1808. It is in sandstone, and is octagonal on an octagonal base, with a sunken lancet panel on each side. The base and the cap are moulded, and on the top is an inscribed brass plate and a gnomon, also in brass.

== Appraisal ==
The church was designated as a Grade II* listed building on 13 February 1967, and on the same date the sundial was listed at Grade II. Grade II* is the middle of the three grades of listing, and is applied to "particularly important buildings of more than special interest", and Grade II, the lowest grade, is applied to buildings that "are of special interest". The architectural historians Hartwell and Pevsner comment in the Buildings in England series that "the church is unostentatious, with no surprises" and, of the interior, "the impression is of calmness and generosity of space".

== Present day ==
St Leonard's is an active Anglican parish church in the deanery of Whalley, the archdeaconry of Blackburn, and the diocese of Blackburn. Its benefice is combined with that of Christ Church, Chatburn. The church holds services on Sundays at 11.15am, alternating between Holy Communion (1st and 3rd Sundays) and Morning Prayer (2nd, 4th and 5th Sundays). All services are from the 1662 Book of Common Prayer (BCP).

== See also ==
- Listed buildings in Downham, Lancashire
