= Sir Ralph Assheton, 1st Baronet =

English aristocrat (1860–1955)

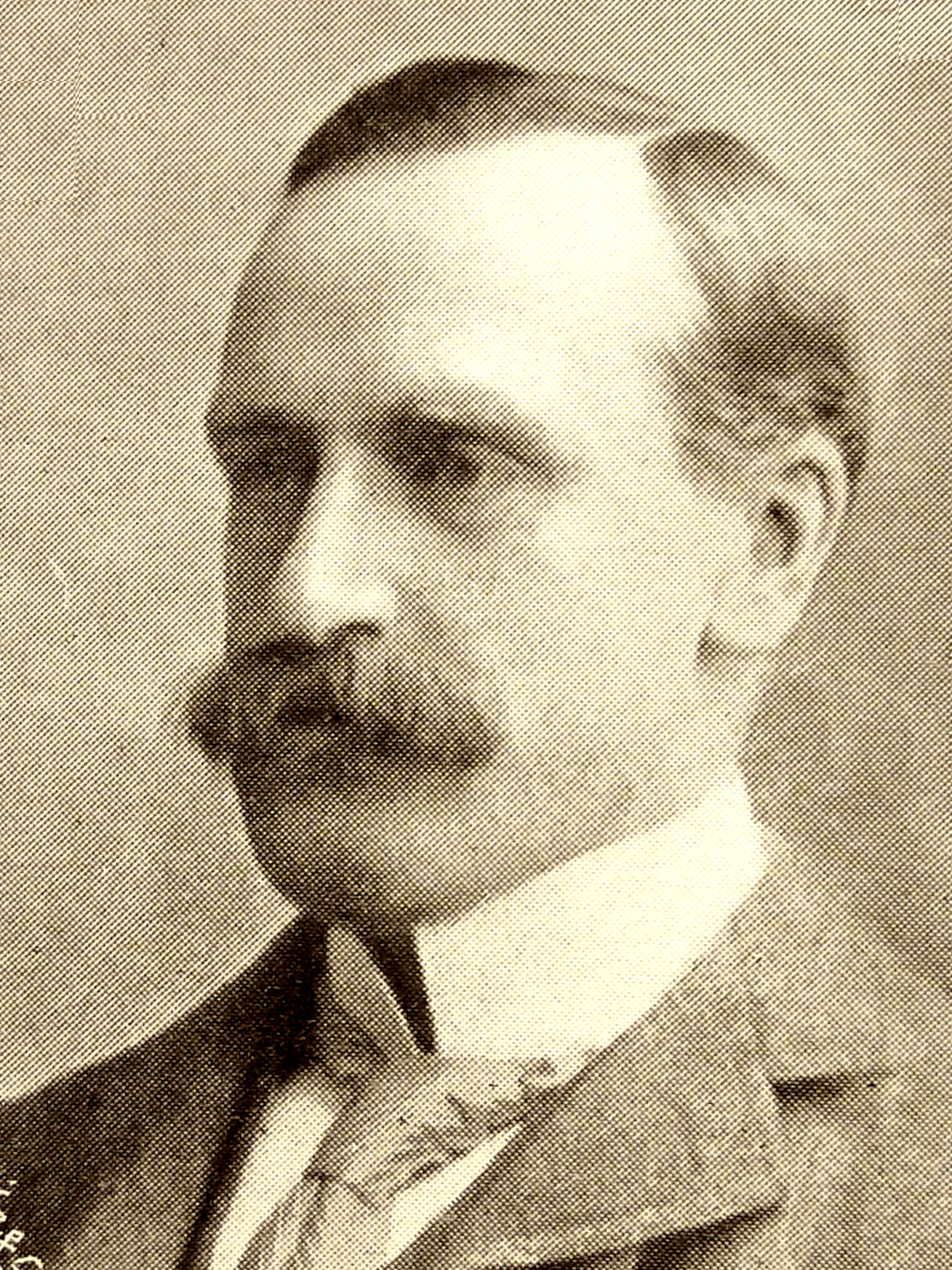
Assheton, in 1902

Sir Ralph Cockayne Assheton, 1st Baronet, JP, DL (13 September 1860 – 21 September 1955), was an English public official.

== Early life ==
Arms of Sir Ralph Assheton: Argent, a mullet sable pierced of the field (with canton of baronet)

Ralph Cockayne Assheton was born in 1860 in Downham, Lancashire. His father was Ralph Assheton (1830–1907), who served as Member of Parliament for Clitheroe from 1868 to 1880, and his mother, Emily Augusta Feilden (1834–1916). His uncle was Joseph Feilden (1824–1895), who served as Member of Parliament for North Lancashire from 1880 to 1885. He attended Eton College and graduated from Jesus College, Cambridge.

== Career ==
Assheton served as a member of the Lancashire County Council in 1892, as well as Justice of the Peace for the West Riding of Yorkshire and Lancashire He also served as Deputy Lieutenant of Lancashire. He then served as Alderman of Lancashire from 1902 to 1949. Moreover, he served as High Sheriff of Lancashire in 1919.

Assheton was created Baronet Assheton, of Downham, on 4 September 1945.

== Personal life ==
Assheton married Mildred Estelle Sybella Master on 27 September 1898. They had four children:

- Dorothy Winifred Assheton (1899–1972)
- Ralph Assheton, 1st Baron Clitheroe (1901–1984)
- Mary Monica Assheton (1903–1982)
- Eleanor Assheton (1907–2000)

Assheton and his wife resided at Downham Hall in Downham, where he was Lord of the manor. Lady Assheton was appointed a Commander of the Order of the British Empire in the 1934 New Year Honours, for political and public services in Lancashire. She died 18 August 1949.

Assheton died in a Manchester hospital on 21 September 1955, following a short illness. The baronetcy was inherited by his only son, who had been created Baron Clitheroe a few months earlier, as part of the 1955 Birthday Honours.

Baronetage of the United Kingdom
New creation	Baronet of Downham; 1945–1955	Succeeded by Ralph Assheton
