= Ainsworth, Greater Manchester =

Coordinates: 53.590°N 2.354°W

Ainsworth
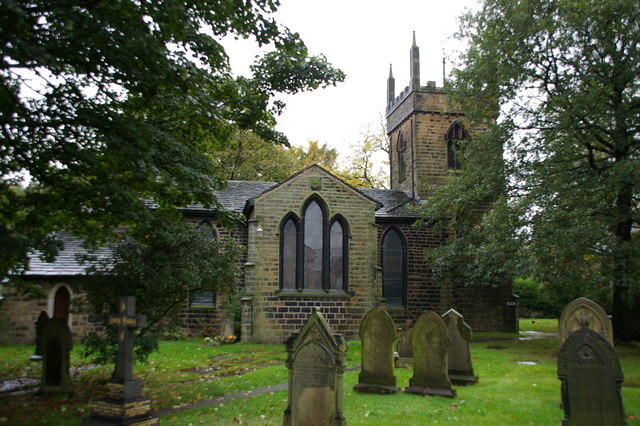
- Ainsworth Parish Church

- Location within Greater Manchester
- OS grid reference: SD765105
  - London: 172 mi (277 km) SE
- Metropolitan borough: Bury
- Metropolitan county: Greater Manchester
- Region: North West
- Country: England
- Sovereign state: United Kingdom
- Post town: BOLTON
- Postcode district: BL2
- Dialling code: 01204
- Police: Greater Manchester
- Fire: Greater Manchester
- Ambulance: North West
- UK Parliament: Bury South

Ainsworth (archaically known as Cockey) is a village and former civil parish in the Bury district, now in Greater Manchester, England. It lies on the western fringe of Bury, 2.2 miles (3.5 km) northwest of Radcliffe, and 2.9 miles (4.7 km) east of Bolton. The city of Manchester is 8.7 miles (14.0 km) south-southeast of Ainsworth. Author and ghostwriter Paul Stenning is a former resident and pupil of Ainsworth County Primary School.

== History ==
The manor of Ainsworth was held by the Assheton family, and through the heiress Eleanor Assheton, passed to the ownership of the Earl of Wilton.

The parish church was rebuilt in 1832. The Presbyterian chapel dates back to 1715. The Methodist church was rebuilt in 1892.

Historically a part of Lancashire, Ainsworth was formerly a chapelry in the parish of Middleton and hundred of Salford, from 1866 Ainsworth was a civil parish in its own right, on 1 October 1933 the parish was abolished and merged with Radcliffe. In 1931 the parish had a population of 1969. It was added to the Radcliffe Urban District in 1933.
