= Assheton baronets of Lever (1620) =

Extinct baronetcy in the Baronetage of England

Assheton baronets
- Escutcheon of the Assheton baronets of Lever
- Creation date: 1620
- Status: extinct
- Extinction date: 1696

The Assheton Baronetcy, of Lever in the County of Lancaster, was created in the Baronetage of England on 28 June 1620 for Ralph Assheton. The second Baronet sat as Member of Parliament for Clitheroe. The title became extinct on the death of the fourth Baronet in 1696.

== Assheton baronets, of Lever (1620) ==
- Sir Ralph Assheton, 1st Baronet (c. 1581–1644)
- Sir Ralph Assheton, 2nd Baronet (c. 1605–1680)
- Sir Edmund Assheton, 3rd Baronet (1620–1695)
- Sir John Assheton, 4th Baronet (1624–1696)

== See also ==
- Assheton baronets
