= William Bucknall =

Sir William Bucknall (25 July 1633 – 1676), of Oxhey, Hertfordshire, was an English merchant, excise farmer and politician who sat in the House of Commons from 1670 to 1676.

Bucknall was the brother of Ralph Bucknall. In 1752, he became a Freeman of the Salters’ Company and acquired interests in water supply and shipping. He married Sarah Chitts, daughter of Thomas Chitts, Woodmonger, of London in 1753.

Bucknall became Freeman of the Brewers’ Company in 1664, an assistant of the company in 1667 and Master for the year 1669 to 1670. He was the main businessman in a syndicate formed to farm the customs by Sir Robert Howard and Charles Powlett, Lord St John. He was joint farmer of excise for London, Middlesex and Surrey from 1665 to 1675. From January to April 1667 he was alderman of London. He was joint farmer of excise for Kent, Essex, Norfolk, Suffolk and Buckinghamshire from 1668 to 1675 and a Commissioner for excise from 1668 to 1675. He was joint farmer of revenue for Ireland from 1669 and a JP for Hertfordshire also from 1669. He was knighted on 20 September 1670. Bucknall was returned as Member of Parliament for Liverpool on 9 December 1670. In 1673 he became JP for St Albans liberty, and was Commissioner for assessment for Hertfordshire, Lancashire, Middlesex and London from 1673 to 1674.

Bucknall died on 26 October 1676, and was buried at Oxhey. He left six surviving sons and three daughters. His son was elected for Middlesex in 1696. His daughter married John Ward.

Parliament of Great Britain
Preceded by Sir Gilbert Ireland; William Stanley	Member of Parliament for Liverpool; 1670–1676; With: Sir Gilbert Ireland 1670-1675; William Banks 1675-1676	Succeeded by Sir Ralph Assheton, Bt. Richard Atherton
