= Listed buildings in Downham, Lancashire =

Downham is a civil parish in Ribble Valley, Lancashire, England. It contains 43 listed buildings that are recorded in the National Heritage List for England. Of these, three are at Grade II*, the middle grade, and the others are at Grade II, the lowest grade. The parish contains the village of Downham and surrounding countryside. Most of the listed buildings are in the village, and include Downham Hall and associated structures, houses and cottages, a church, a public house, a school, milestones, a bridge, and a set of stocks. Outside the village the listed buildings are farmhouses and farm buildings.

== Key ==
Grade	Criteria
II*	Particularly important buildings of more than special interest
II	Buildings of national importance and special interest

== Buildings ==
Name and location	Photograph	Date	Notes	Grade
St Leonard's Church; 53.89449°N 2.32968°W		Late 15th century	The oldest part of the church is the tower, the rest of the church having been built in 1909–10 and designed by Mervyn Macartney. It is in sandstone with a slate roof, and consists of a nave and chancel under a continuous roof, a south aisle, a south porch, and a west tower. The tower is in Perpendicular style, with diagonal buttresses. At the top is an embattled parapet with corner pinnacles and gargoyles.	II*
Gate piers 53.89468°N 2.33079°W	—	c. 1600	The two gate piers are in the garden of Downham Hall, and have been moved from another building. They are in sandstone. The piers originated as columns, each of which has a fluted shaft, a foliated neck, and an abacus with egg-and-dart decoration.	II
1 Lower Hall Cottages; 53.89338°N 2.32947°W		17th century	The house was extended in 1824. It is mainly in limestone with a stone-slate roof, in three storeys. The windows are mullioned, and there is a doorway with a chamfered surround. The rear wall is blank, and contains an outshut.	II
Downham Hall; 53.89464°N 2.33154°W		17th century	Most of the present building is the result of a remodelling in 1834–35 by George Webster. It is built in limestone and sandstone with sandstone dressings and a slate roof. The house has an H-shaped plan with a hall and cross wings, and there are two storeys with attics. In the centre is a pedimented gable and a single-storey portico with four unfluted Greek Doric columns. The windows are sashes.	II*
Barn and stable, Downham Hall; 53.89507°N 2.33225°W		17th century (probable)	The building is in limestone with sandstone dressings and a stone-slate roof. The barn has a wide entrance, doorways, a pitching hole, and a lean-to, and contains narrow seven-bay aisles. The former stable is higher and has doorways, windows, one of which is mullioned, and a pitching hole.	II
Hook Cliffe Farmhouse and farm building 53.88185°N 2.32357°W		17th century	The house and attached farm building are in sandstone with a stone-slate roof. They have two storeys, and consist of a main range and a cross wing. Most of the windows are mullioned, and the main doorway has a chamfered surround and a Tudor arched head. The farm building contains a pitching hole.	II
Old Well Hall; 53.89323°N 2.32762°W		17th century	Originally one house, later divided into three, it is in stone with sandstone dressings and a stone-slate roof. The house has two storeys and attics, with mullioned windows. In the centre is a two-storey gabled porch that contains a doorway with a moulded surround, a segmental head, and moulded imposts. Above the doorway is a blank rectangular plaque, a two-light window and, in the gable, a blocked oculus.	II*
Ravens Holme Farmhouse; 53.88570°N 2.29384°W	—	17th century	The farmhouse is in sandstone with a stone-slate roof, and has two storeys. The windows are mullioned, and the doorway has a chamfered surround and a segmental head. Above the doorway is a hood of two pitched stone slates.	II
Sundial base 53.88558°N 2.29393°W	—	1664	The sundial base is in the garden of Ravens Holme Farmhouse. It is in sandstone and has a square plan and chamfered edges on an octagonal base. The sides are inscribed towards the top.	II
5 and 6 Top Row; 53.89482°N 2.32941°W		Late 17th century	Originally one house, later divided into two, in stone, partly rendered, and with a stone-slate roof. There are two storeys and two bays. In the centre are paired doorways, and the windows are mullioned.	II
Hecklin Farmhouse; 53.88699°N 2.29938°W		Late 17th century	A sandstone house with a stone-slate roof, in two storeys and four bays. The windows are mullioned. There are two doorways with chamfered surrounds, one of which also has a Tudor arched head.	II
Milestone; 53.88039°N 2.28150°W		18th century	The milestone is in sandstone and has a square plan. It is inscribed with the distances in miles to Clitheroe, Colne, Gisburn, and Burnley.	II
Milestone; 53.89544°N 2.33286°W		18th century	The milestone is in sandstone and has a rectangular plan, with a semicircular top and chamfered edges. It is inscribed with the distances in miles to Colne, Gisburn, and Clitheroe.	II
White House; 53.89351°N 2.32846°W		18th century (probable)	A stone house with a stone-slate roof, in two storeys and three bays. The windows have three lights, mullions, and plain surrounds. There is a single-storey gabled porch, also with a plain surround.	II
Assheton Arms; 53.89463°N 2.32902°W		1765	The public house is in limestone with a stone-slate roof, and has two storeys and four bays. The windows are sashes, some with mullions. The two doorways have plain surrounds, and above the main door is an open pediment hood. To the right, and incorporated into the public house, are former cottages.	II
7 Top Row; 53.89483°N 2.32936°W		Late 18th century	A sandstone house with a stone-slate roof, in two storeys and two bays. The windows on the front have three lights with mullions, and they contain casements. The doorway has a moulded open pediment, above which is a blank niche. The left gable contains sash windows.	II
Briar Cottage and 44 Village Street; 53.89318°N 2.32796°W		Late 18th century	A pair of sandstone houses with a stone-slate roof in two storeys. Briar Cottage has one bay, and No. 44 has two. Most of the windows have three lights and mullions, and containsashes. The doorways have plain surrounds.	II
Fir Tree House; 53.89290°N 2.32720°W		Late 18th century	The house contains some 17th-century material. It is in stone with a stone-slate roof, and has two storeys and two bays with a two-storey lean-to to the right. The windows and doorway have plain surrounds, the windows being mullioned.	II
Hollins Farmhouse and barn 53.88751°N 2.30415°W		Late 18th century	The house and barn are in sandstone with a stone-slate roof. The house has two storeys and two bays. The doorway and the windows have plain surrounds, and the windows are mullioned. In the barn is a wide entrance with an outshut porch, a doorway, a window, and a lean-to extension.	II
Pendlehurst and The Cottage; 53.89340°N 2.32825°W		Late 18th century	A pair of limestone cottages with sandstone dressings and a stone-slate roof. They have two storeys, and each house has one bay. The windows have three lights and mullions, and the doorways have long-and-short jambs.	II
Laneside Farmhouse and barn 53.89029°N 2.32366°W		1782	The building is in sandstone with a stone-slate roof. The house has two storeys and two bays. The doorway and the windows have plain surrounds. The windows are mullioned, and above the doorway is an inscribed plaque. To the right is a barn that has a wide entrance with a segmental head, and two doorways, one of which is blocked.	II
36 and 37 Chapel Brow; 53.89211°N 2.32633°W		c. 1800	A stone house with sandstone dressings and a stone-slate roof, in two storeys and three bays. The windows are mullioned and contain casements. There are two doors, one with a plain surround, the other with a chamfered surround and an inscribed lintel.	II
45 Village Street; 53.89326°N 2.32807°W		c. 1800	A sandstone house with a stone-slate roof, in two storeys and two bays. The windows and doors have plain surrounds. The windows are sashes, those in the ground floor having mullions.	II
Back o' t'Thorn; 53.89240°N 2.32585°W		c. 1800	A house that originated as cottages, with two storeys and three bays. The right bay is in sandstone, the other bays are in limestone, and the roof is in stone-slate. The windows are mullioned, and the windows and doorways have plain surrounds. Above each of the doors still in use is a hood of two pitched slates.	II
Sundial; 53.89436°N 2.32958°W		1808	The sundial is in the churchyard of St Leonard's Church. It is in sandstone, and is octagonal on an octagonal base. On the top is a brass plate and a gnomon.	II
Farm building, Downham Hall; 53.89506°N 2.33178°W		1812	The farm building is in sandstone with a stone-slate roof, and is in two storeys. The lower storey is open and is supported by three chamfered stone piers. The north gable end has a first floor doorway approached by external stone steps.	II
Village Hall; 53.89177°N 2.32575°W		1817	The building originated as a Methodist chapel. It is in sandstone with a stone-slate roof, and has two storeys and a symmetrical three-bay front. The central doorway has a semicircular head with a projecting keystone and impost bands. The windows on the front are casements, and on the left gable end are two sash windows and a three-light mullioned window.	II
Downham Mill; 53.90156°N 2.32104°W		1818	The mill has been used later as a farm building. It is in stone with a slate roof, and has an L-shaped plan with two storeys and an attic. The building contains windows, some of which are mullioned, and doorways, some of which are blocked.	II
2 Lower Hall Cottages; 53.89334°N 2.32930°W		1824	The house is mainly in limestone with sandstone dressings and a stone-slate roof in two storeys. Most of the windows are mullioned and contain sashes, and the doorway has a chamfered surround. In the upper storey is a window with an inscribed lintel and sill.	II
2, 3 and 4 Top Row; 53.89478°N 2.32956°W		1825	A row of three sandstone houses with a slate roof. They are in two storeys, and each house has a single bay. The doorways and windows have plain surrounds, and the windows are sashes.	II
Barn north of Fir Tree House; 53.89314°N 2.32724°W		Early 19th century (possible)	The barn is in limestone with a stone-slate roof. It contains a wide entrance with a segmental head, to the left of which is a doorway with a chamfered surround, and to the right is a window.	II
Bridge; 53.89277°N 2.32741°W		Early 19th century (probable)	The bridge carries a road over Downham Beck. It is in sandstone, and consists of a single narrow segmental arch with a string course and a solid parapet. The parapet is curved and ends in round piers with domed caps.	II
35 Chapel Brow; 53.89215°N 2.32647°W		Early 19th century	A sandstone house with a stone-slate roof, in two storeys and two bays. The windows in the left bay have three lights and mullions. All the windows contain casements, and the doorway has a plain surround. To the left is a lower wing.	II
Door and surround, Downham Hall; 53.89436°N 2.33001°W		Early 19th century (probable)	The door is in a wall in the garden of Downham Hall. It is in timber, and its surround is in sandstone. The surround has an architrave carved with a false keystone and contains a shield of arms and an inscription.	II
House south of Downham Mill; 53.90145°N 2.32106°W		Early 19th century	The house is partly in limestone and partly in sandstone, and has a slate roof. There are two storeys and two bays. The windows are mullioned with plain surrounds. The doorway also has a plain surround, and a hood of two pitched stone slates.	II
Greengates; 53.89248°N 2.32590°W		Early 19th century	A sandstone house with a stone-slate roof, in two storeys and two bays. The windows and doorway have plain surrounds. The windows are sashes, and above the doorway is a hood of two pitched slates.	II
The Lidgett House; 53.89422°N 2.32812°W		1830s	Originating as the vicarage, the house is in sandstone with a hipped slate roof. It has two storeys and three bays with corner pilasters, and there is a lower bay to the left. The windows are sashes. In the centre is a single-storey porch with Doric pilasters and a cornice. The doorway has a fanlight with a segmental arch.	II
School; 53.89375°N 2.32831°W		1839	The school is in limestone with sandstone dressings and a slate roof, and is in one storey. In the centre is a porch with a moulded open pediment containing an inscribed plaque. The windows are mullioned with hood moulds, and to the right of the main block is a lower wing.	II
Clay House Farmhouse; 53.88931°N 2.31400°W		Mid-19th century	A sandstone house with a stone-slate roof in two storeys and two bays. The windows are mullioned, and the doorway has a plain surround with a gabled porch.	II
Gate piers 53.89389°N 2.32926°W		Mid-19th century (probable)	The two gate piers are in the garden of Downham Hall. They are in sandstone, and have bases, entablatures, and urns. On the sides are pilasters, those in the west side are fluted and have Corinthian capitals.	II
Stables and coach house, Downham Hall; 53.89480°N 2.33066°W	—	1857	The stables and coach house are in sandstone with a slate roof, in two storeys and with an L-shaped plan. The windows are sashes. The north face has three bays, the central bay projecting and pedimented. This bay contains a wide entrance that has an elliptical arch with an inscribed keystone, and in the pediment is an oculus.	II
Post Office and house 53.89444°N 2.32867°W		c. 1910	The house and shop are mainly in limestone with sandstone dressings and a slate roof, and are in two storeys. Most of the windows are sashes, some of which have mullions. Other features include an open timber porch and a gable with a ball finial.	II.
Stocks; 53.89438°N 2.32907°W		Uncertain	The stocks consist of two rectangular sandstone pillars with a bottom stone rail which is partly buried. On the inner sides of the pillars are grooves for a wooden board, which is missing.	II
