= William Banks (died 1676) =

English politician

William Banks (or Bankes; c. 1630 – 6 July 1676) of Winstanley Hall, Wigan was an English politician who sat in the House of Commons twice between 1660 and 1676.

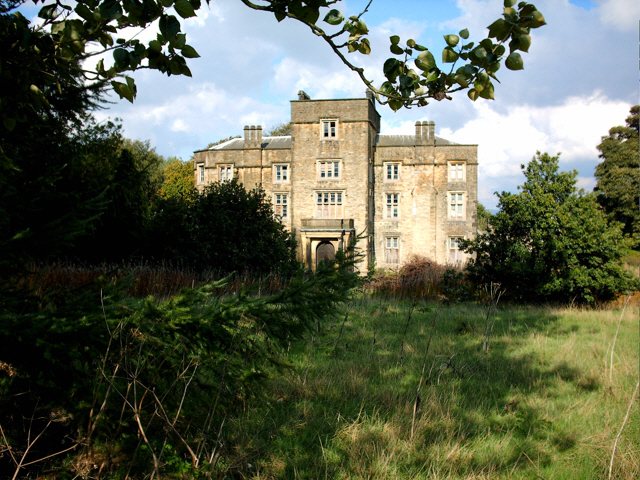
Winstanley Hall, Wigan

Banks was the only surviving son of William Banks of Winstanley, by his second wife Sarah Jones, daughter of Walter Jones of Chastleton, Oxfordshire. He succeeded to the Winstanley estate on the death of his father in 1666.

In 1660, he was elected Member of Parliament for Newton and was Deputy Lieutenant for Lancashire from around August 1660 to 1662, and from 1663 to his death. He was commissioner for assessment from August 1660 to 1674, commissioner for corporations from 1662 to 1663 and joint farmer of excise from 1665 to 1674. He was a J.P. from 1665 to 1666 and from 1670 until his death. He was a freeman of Liverpool by 1670 and a Vice-Admiral of Lancashire and Cheshire from 1673 to his death. In May 1675 he was elected MP for Liverpool.

Banks died on 6 July 1676 aged 46, during the long parliamentary recess, and was buried at Chastleton.

Banks had married Frances Legh, daughter of Peter Legh of Bruch Hall, Lancashire on 23 October 1656 and had four sons and three daughters. His eldest son William Banks (died 1690) was MP for Wigan.

Parliament of England
Preceded by William Brereton; Peter Legh	Member of Parliament for Newton; 1660; With: Richard Legh	Succeeded by Richard Legh; John Vaughan
Preceded by Sir Gilbert Ireland; Sir William Bucknall	Member of Parliament for Liverpool; 1675–1676; With: Sir William Bucknall	Succeeded by Sir Ralph Assheton; Richard Atherton
