= Presbyterian Chapel, Ainsworth =

Listed building in Greater Manchester, England

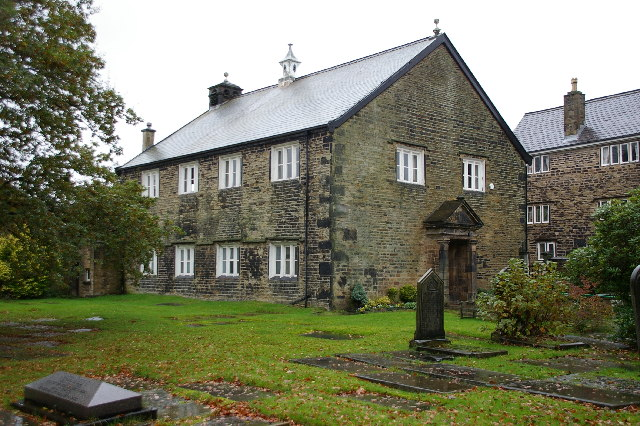
- The chapel in 2005

- Location within Greater Manchester

General information
- Type: Chapel
- Location: Knowsley Road, Ainsworth, Greater Manchester, England
- Coordinates: 53.5889°N 2.3595°W
- Year built: 1715; 311 years ago
- Renovated: 1773 (enlarged); 1845 (altered)

Listed Building – Grade II*
- Official name: Presbyterian Chapel
- Designated: 29 July 1966
- Reference no.: 1163487

The Presbyterian Chapel, Ainsworth is a Grade II* listed chapel on Knowsley Road in Ainsworth, a village within the Metropolitan Borough of Bury, Greater Manchester, England. Originally built in 1715, the building has served as a place of worship for over three centuries.

== History ==
The chapel was established by a congregation that emerged from the Great Ejection of 1662, when nonconforming ministers were expelled from the Church of England. One such minister, John Lever, initially preached at Cockey Chapel before the congregation built the current chapel in 1715. It was enlarged in 1773 and altered in 1845, when the entrance was moved from the south side to the east wall.

The chapel transitioned from Presbyterianism to Unitarianism in the early 19th century. A memorial plaque inside commemorates Joseph Bealey, who openly declared his Unitarian beliefs in April 1813, shortly before the passage of the Doctrine of the Trinity Act later that year.

On 29 July 1966, the Presbyterian Chapel was designated a Grade II* listed building.

== Architecture ==
The building has a domestic appearance, constructed in a rectangular plan with two tiers of three-light chamfered mullioned windows. The pediment above the doorway bears the inscription: "Erected AD 1715. Enlarged 1773. Altered and repaired 1845".

=== Interior ===
Internally, the chapel is arranged in a long-wall fashion, with the pulpit on the north wall. A gallery supported by turned wooden columns runs along three sides of the interior, with one column replaced or supplemented by a cast-iron support. The chapel retains box pews, typical of 18th-century nonconformist places of worship.

== Burial ground and surroundings ==
The chapel is situated in the north-west corner of an extensive burial ground, which contains gravestones dating from the 18th and 19th centuries. Nearby is Hook's Cottage, built in 1773, and the former Reform Club, which provided accommodation for worshippers travelling from afar. It also stands close to the Grade II-listed Duke William Inn, another historic building in the village.

== See also ==
- Grade II* listed buildings in Greater Manchester
- Listed buildings in Radcliffe, Greater Manchester
