= William Assheton =

English cleric, writer and life assurance pioneer

William Assheton (1641–1711) was an English cleric, a prolific writer and life assurance pioneer.

== Early life ==
Assheton was born at Middleton, Lancashire, in the year 1641. His father, who was rector of the parish, was one of the ancient knightly family of the place. After a preliminary education at a private country school he entered Brasenose 3 July 1658, where he is said by Anthony Wood to have had a presbyterian tutor, and to have been an attendant at the religious meetings held at the house of Elizabeth Hampton, a laundress. He gained a fellowship of his college in 1663, when he was B.A.

== Clerical life ==
Having entered holy orders and taken his master's degree, he became a frequent preacher. James Butler, 1st Duke of Ormonde, who was chancellor of the university, appointed him chaplain, and in that capacity he served both in England and Ireland. He gained the degree of D.D. in 1673; next month he had the prebend of Knaresborough in the church of York. The interest of his patron procured him the livings of St. Antholin's, London, and Beckenham, Kent, where he settled in 1676.

== Later life ==
A few years before his death he was asked to become master of his college, but was too infirm to accept. He died at Beckenham in September 1711, and was buried in the chancel of that church.

== Writings ==
- 1. 'Toleration Disapproved,' Oxford, 1670; there were two editions in the same year, one of which was anonymous (B.M.), Oxford, 1671 (B.M.), 1736 (B.M.).
- 2. 'Danger of Hypocrisie,' London, 1673 (B.M.).
- 3. 'Seasonable Apology for the Honours and Revenues of the Clergy' (Judicium Carolinum), London, 1674, 1676 (B.M.).
- 4. 'The Cases of Scandal and Persecution,' London, 1674 (B.M. and 1676); this was answered by Baxter.
- 5. 'The Royal Apology,' London, 1684 (B.M.).
- 6. 'An Admonition to a Deist,' London, 1685, anonymous (B.M.).
- 7. ' A Seasonable Vindication of their Present Majesties,' 1688.
- 8. 'An Explanation of his Reasons for taking the Oath of Allegiance to William and Mary.'
- 9. 'Country Parson's Admonition to his Parishioners against Popery,' London, 1686, 1689, 1706 (B.M.).
- 10. 'A Defence of the Plain Man's Reply to the Catholick Missionaries,' London, 1688; two editions with some variations in the title.
- 11. 'The Substance of a late Conference with M. S. concerning (1) the Rudeness of Atheistic Discourse; (2) the Certainty and Eternity of Hell Torments; (3) the Truth and Authority of the Holy Scriptures,' London, 1690 (B.M.).
- 12. 'Discourse against Blasphemy,' London, 1691, 1694 (B.M.).
- 13. 'Discourse against Drunkenness,' London, 1692.
- 14. 'A Discourse against Swearing and Cursing,' London, 1692; these three were published at twopence each, in order that they might be extensively circulated as an aid to the royal proclamation for the reformation of manners. *
- 15. 'Directions in order to the Suppression of Debauchery and Prophaneness,' London, 1693.
- 16. 'Conference with an Anabaptist,' pt. i., London, 1694; this was the worthy churchman's move against a baptist meeting which had arisen in his parish, but it did not flourish, and its removal or dissolution saved him from the necessity of further argumentation.
- 17. 'A Short Exposition of the Preliminary Questions and Answers of the Church Catechism, being an introduction to a Defence of Infant Baptism,' London, 1694 (B.M.).
- 18. 'Discourse concerning a Death-bed Repentance,' London, 1696 (B.M.), 1765 (B.M.), 1800 (B.M.), 1802 (B.M.), 1807 (B.M.); this is said to have been preached before Queen Mary, and after her death enlarged and dedicated to the king. It was reprinted in 1872 with Baxter's 'Call to the Unconverted.'
- 19. 'Theological Discourse of Last Wills and Testaments,' London, 1696 (B.M.).
- 20. 'Seasonable Vindication of the Blessed Trinity, collected from the works of Tillotson and Stillingfleet,' London, 1697 (B.M.).
- 21. 'Method of Daily Devotion,' London, 1697 (B.M.).
- 22. 'Brief State of the Socinian Controversy, collected from the works of Isaac Barrow,' London, 1698.
- 23. 'The Plain Man's Devotion,' London, 1689, 1698.
- 24. 'A Full Account of the Rise, Progress, and Advantages of Dr. Assheton's Proposal, as now improved and managed by the Company of Mercers, London, for the benefit of widows of clergymen and others by settled jointures and annuities at the rate of thirty per cent., London, 1699 (B.M.), 1700 (B.M.), 1710 (B.M.), 1711 (B.M.), 1713 (B.M.), 1724 (B.M.).
- 25. 'Sermon preached before the Sons of the Clergy,' London, 1699.
- 26. 'Sermon preached before the Hon. Society of the Natives of Kent,' London, 1700 (B.M.).
- 27. 'Vindication of the Immortality of the Soul,' London, 1703.
- 28. ' Brief Exhortation to the Holy Communion,' London, 1705, 1775 (B.M.).
- 29. 'Method of Devotion for Sick and Dying Persons,' London, 1706 (B.M.), 2nd ed. 1745.
- 30. 'The Possibility of Apparitions,' by a Divine of the Church of England, London, 1706 (B.M.); this book has an interesting place in literary history, for it was occasioned by Defoe's fabricated story of the appearance of the ghost of Mrs. Veal.
- 31. 'Occasional Prayers from Taylor, Cosins, Ken, &c., and a collection of Hymns,' London, 1708.
- 32. 'A Seasonable Vindication of the Clergy, by a Divine of the Church,' London, 1709.
- 33. 'Directions for the Conversation of the Clergy, collected from Stillingfleet,' London, 1710. In the above list such writings of Assheton's as are in the British Museum are indicated by the letters B.M. attached to them.

Assheton was more a compiler than an original writer. Assheton published anti-nonconformist pamphlets as well as works of popular devotion for lay people and collected editions of works by major theological writers. He was a man of learning, 'readily subscribed to the publishing all critical, learned, and laborious works,' and had a good library, the duplicates from which he gave for the use of ministers in Wales and in the highlands of Scotland. He dealt easily with his parishioners on the sore point of tithes, preached regularly, kept hospitality, and, though trying to live peaceably, was not afraid to rebuke those whose conduct seemed to deserve it. It is noted as a sign of his moderation that he did not set up a coach until the ill-health of his wife required it. At one time he preached extemporaneously, but afterwards resorted to written discourses, because on one occasion a woman swooned in his congregation, and the commotion so upset the good man that he was unable to recover the thread of his thoughts.

== Insurance fund ==
Assheton's scheme for providing annuities for the 'widows of the clergy and others' was the earliest attempt in England on a large scale in the direction of modern life insurance. His plan was offered unsuccessfully to the Corporation of the Sons of the Clergy, and to the Bank of England, but was eventually adopted by the Mercers' Company in 1698. Its failure was due to poor knowledge of vital statistics. Something like a scale was formed. Married men under thirty were allowed to subscribe just £100; under forty they might not subscribe more than £500; under sixty they were limited to £300.

John Francis wrote:

'When this was commenced, it was considered a very notable plan. It was thought that it would prove a good business speculation; and on considerable sums being subscribed the corporation rejoiced greatly. It was soon discovered, however, that the undertaking was founded on a mistake; so the first breach of faith was in lowering the annuity. This proved insufficient, and the company became unable to meet their engagements. They had fixed payments to their annuitants at the rate of thirty per cent., and now they saw their funds almost annihilated by the error. At last they stopped payment altogether; but the distress was so acute that, recollecting one or two forced loans they had made to the monarchs of England in the troublous times of old, they petitioned parliament in 1747 for assistance. [...] At Michaelmas 1745 they found themselves indebted to the said charities and their other creditors 100,000l.; they were liable for present annuities to the extent of 7,620l.; for annuities in expectancy, 1,000l. a year; the whole of their income being 4,100l.'

The parliamentary aid amounted, according to Richard Price in his Observations on Reversionary Payments, to £3,000 per annum, and they were then able to meet their engagements.
