= Sir Ralph Assheton, 2nd Baronet, of Middleton =

English landowner and politician (1651–1716)

Sir Ralph Assheton Bt

Member of Parliament for Lancashire
- In office 1694–1698
- Preceded by: Charles Gerard, Viscount Brandon
- Succeeded by: The Hon. Fitton Gerard

Member of Parliament for Liverpool
- In office March 1677 – 1679
- Preceded by: William Banks
- Succeeded by: Ruisshe Wentworth

Personal details
- Born: 11 February 1651 Middleton, Lancashire, UK
- Died: 3 May 1716 (aged 65) Middleton, Lancashire, UK
- Spouse(s): (1) Mary Vavasour; (2) Mary Hyde
- Children: 4
- Relatives: Sir Ralph Assheton, 1st Bt (father); Sir Ralph Assheton, 3rd Bt (nephew)
- Education: Brasenose College, Oxford
- Occupation: Politician

Sir Ralph Assheton, 2nd Baronet (11 February 1651 – 3 May 1716) of Middleton Hall and Whalley Abbey, Lancashire, was an English landowner and politician who represented Liverpool (1677–79) and Lancashire (1694–98) as a Member of Parliament.

== Early life ==
Baptised on 19 February 1651 in Middleton in Lancashire, he was the son of Sir Ralph Assheton, 1st Baronet, of Middleton, and Anne Assheton, daughter of Sir Ralph Assheton, 1st Baronet, of Great Lever. Assheton was educated at Brasenose College, Oxford, where he matriculated in 1668. In 1665, he succeeded to his father's baronetcy and in 1696, he inherited the family's estates in Downham near Whalley, Lancashire from his uncle Sir John Assheton, 4th Baronet, of Lever.

== Career ==
From March 1677 to 1679, Assheton was Member of Parliament (MP) for Liverpool and from 1694 to 1698 for Lancashire. He was a Justice of the Peace for Lancashire from 1675 to 1687 and from 1689 until his death. He died, aged 65, and was buried at Middleton. In the baronetcy, he was succeeded by his nephew, Sir Ralph Assheton, 3rd Baronet, of Middleton.

Assheton had a private book collection of some significance and works from his collection can be identified by the presence of his engraved bookplate.

== Family ==
Assheton had married firstly Mary Vavasour, the daughter of Thomas Vavasour of Spaldington, Yorkshire, with whom he had one son (who predeceased him) and three daughters. He married, secondly, to Mary Hyde, the daughter of Robert Hyde of Denton, Lancashire. His daughter Catherine Assheton (d.1728) married Thomas Lister (1688–1745).

Parliament of England
Preceded by Sir William Bucknall; William Banks	Member of Parliament for Liverpool; 1677–1679; With: Richard Atherton	Succeeded by Ruisshe Wentworth; John Dubois
Preceded by Charles Gerard; James Stanley	Member of Parliament for Lancashire; 1694–1698; With: James Stanley	Succeeded by James Stanley; Fitton Gerard
Baronetage of England
Preceded by Ralph Assheton	Baronet (of Middleton); 1665–1716	Succeeded by Ralph Assheton
