= Assheton baronets of Middleton (1660) =

Extinct baronetcy in the Baronetage of England

Assheton baronets
- Escutcheon of the Assheton baronets of Middleton
- Creation date: 1660
- Status: extinct
- Extinction date: 1765

The Assheton Baronetcy, of Middleton in the County of Lancaster, was created in the Baronetage of England on 17 August 1660 for Ralph Assheton. The second Baronet sat as Member of Parliament for Liverpool and Lancashire. The title became extinct on the death of the third Baronet in 1765.

== Assheton baronets, of Middleton (1660) ==
- Sir Ralph Assheton, 1st Baronet (1626–1665)
- Sir Ralph Assheton, 2nd Baronet (1652–1716)
- Sir Ralph Assheton, 3rd Baronet (died 1765)

== See also ==
- Assheton baronets
