= Ralph Assheton, 2nd Baron Clitheroe =

English aristocrat, businessman and public official (1929–2026)

The Right Honourable The Lord Clitheroe DL

Member of the House of Lords
- Lord Temporal
- In office 18 September 1984 – 11 November 1999 as a hereditary peer
- Preceded by: The 1st Baron Clitheroe
- Succeeded by: Seat abolished (Note: Pursuant to the House of Lords Act 1999.)

Personal details
- Born: Ralph John Assheton; 2 November 1929
- Died: 19 January 2026 (aged 96)
- Occupation: Businessman, public official

Ralph John Assheton, 2nd Baron Clitheroe (3 November 1929 – 19 January 2026) was an English aristocrat, businessman and public official, who was a member of the House of Lords.

== Life and career ==
Clitheroe was born on 3 November 1929. His father was Ralph Assheton, 1st Baron Clitheroe (1901–1984), a Conservative Member of Parliament who served as Chairman of the Conservative Party from 1944 to 1946, and his mother was the Hon. Sylvia Benita Frances Hotham. His paternal grandfather was Sir Ralph Assheton, 1st Baronet (1860–1955), and his maternal grandfather was Frederick Hotham, 6th Baron Hotham (1863–1923).

He attended Eton College, and served as a 2nd Lieutenant in the Life Guards from 1948 to 1949. In 1956 he received the degree of Bachelor of Arts (BA) (later converted to Master of Arts (MA)) from Christ Church, Oxford.

Clitheroe served as Deputy Chief Executive of the Rio Tinto Group, and as Chairman of RTZ Chemicals, a subsidiary of Rio Tinto. He also served as Chairman of the Yorkshire Bank from 1990 to 1999.

He became the 2nd Baron Clitheroe and 3rd Baronet on the death of his father in 1984. He was appointed to be a Deputy Lieutenant of Lancashire in 1986. He became a Liveryman of the Worshipful Company of Skinners in 1955. He also served as Vice-Lord-Lieutenant of Lancashire from 1995 to 1999.

Clitheroe died on 19 January 2026, at the age of 96.

== Family ==
On 2 May 1961 Clitheroe married Juliet Hanbury on 2 May 1961, with whom he had three children:

- Lt Col. Ralph Christopher Assheton, 3rd Baron Clitheroe (born 19 March 1962)
- Hon. John Hotham Assheton (born 12 July 1964)
- Hon. Elizabeth Jane Assheton (born 6 October 1968)

Clitheroe resided at Downham Hall in Lancashire.

== Notes ==
Peerage of the United Kingdom
Preceded by Ralph Assheton	Baron Clitheroe; 1984–2026; Member of the House of Lords (1984–1999)	Succeeded by Ralph Assheton
Baronetage of the United Kingdom
Preceded by Ralph Assheton	Baronet of Downham; 1984–2026	Succeeded by Ralph Assheton
