= Baron Clitheroe =

Title in the Peerage of the United Kingdom

- Argent, a mullet sable pierced of the field
- Creation date: 20 June 1955
- Created by: Queen Elizabeth II
- Peerage: Peerage of the United Kingdom
- First holder: Ralph Assheton, 1st Baron Clitheroe
- Present holder: Ralph Assheton, 3rd Baron Clitheroe
- Heir apparent: Hon. Ralph Assheton
- Remainder to: 1st Baron's heirs male of the body lawfully begotten
- Seat: Downham Hall
- Motto: Nec arrogo nec dubito ("I am neither proud nor hesitant")

Baron Clitheroe of Downham in the County of Lancaster is a title in the Peerage of the United Kingdom. It was created in the 1955 Birthday Honours for the Conservative politician Ralph Assheton, who had previously served as Financial Secretary to the Treasury. He was the son of Ralph Cockayne Assheton, for many years a member of the Lancashire County Council, who had been created baronet of Downham in the County of Lancaster, on 4 September 1945. Three months after being raised to the peerage, Lord Clitheroe succeeded his father in the baronetcy. The titles are currently held by the first Baron's grandson.

In the immediate aftermath of World War II, Ralph Assheton also acquired title to the manorial and mineral rights as well as land holdings within the former Honour of Clitheroe. These were purchased out of the Clitheroe Estate Company following its administration in 1945. They included the Lordship of the Forest of Pendle.

The Assheton family, also spelled Ashton, derive from Ashton-under-Lyne. The military commander Sir John de Assheton (or de Ashton) was among their ancestors.

The family seat is Downham Hall, near Downham, Lancashire.

== Assheton baronets of Downham (1945) ==
- Sir Ralph Cockayne Assheton, 1st Baronet (1860–1955)
- Sir Ralph Assheton, 2nd Baronet (1901–1984) (created Baron Clitheroe in 1955)

=== Barons Clitheroe (1955) ===
- Ralph Assheton, 1st Baron Clitheroe (1901–1984)
- Ralph John Assheton, 2nd Baron Clitheroe (1929−2026)
- Ralph Christopher Assheton, 3rd Baron Clitheroe (born 1962)

The heir apparent is the present holder's son, the Hon. Ralph Anthony Assheton (born 1998).

=== Line of succession ===
- Sir Ralph Cockayne Assheton, 1st Baronet (1860–1955)
  - Ralph Assheton, 1st Baron Clitheroe (1901–1984)
    - Ralph John Assheton, 2nd Baron Clitheroe (1929−2026)
      - Ralph Christopher Assheton, 3rd Baron Clitheroe (born 1962)
        - (1) Hon. Ralph Anthony Assheton (born 1998)
      - (2) Hon. John Hotham Assheton (born 1964)
        - (3) William Hotham Assheton (born 1992)
        - (4) James Charles Assheton (born 1999)
    - Hon. Nicholas Assheton (1934–2012)
      - (5) Thomas Assheton (born 1963)
        - (6) Noah Frederick Assheton (born 1991)
