= Ralph Assheton, 1st Baron Clitheroe =

British Conservative politician (1901–1984)

The Right Honourable The Lord Clitheroe KCVO KStJ PC JP DL
- The Lord Clitheroe in 1956

Member of the House of Lords
- Lord Temporal
- In office 21 June 1955 – 18 September 1984
- Preceded by: Peerage created
- Succeeded by: The 2nd Baron Clitheroe

Member of Parliament for Blackburn West
- In office 23 February 1950 – 6 May 1955
- Preceded by: Constituency established
- Succeeded by: Constituency abolished

Member of Parliament for City of London
- In office 31 October 1945 – 3 February 1950
- Preceded by: George Broadbridge; Andrew Duncan
- Succeeded by: Constituency abolished

Member of Parliament for Rushcliffe
- In office 26 July 1934 – 15 June 1945
- Preceded by: Henry Betterton
- Succeeded by: Florence Paton

Personal details
- Born: Ralph Assheton; 24 February 1901
- Died: 18 September 1984 (aged 83)
- Spouse: Sylvia Benita Frances Hotham (m. 1923)
- Children: 4

Ralph Assheton, 1st Baron Clitheroe (24 February 1901 – 18 September 1984), was an English aristocrat and politician.

== Biography ==
Assheton was born on 24 February 1901. His father was Sir Ralph Assheton, 1st Baronet (1860–1955), and his mother was Mildred Estelle Sybella Master (1884–1949). He was educated at Summer Fields School and Eton College.

Assheton was Member of Parliament (MP) for Rushcliffe from 1934 to 1945, for the City of London from 1945 to 1950, and for Blackburn West from 1950 to 1955. In the wartime government under Winston Churchill, he was Minister of Supply in 1942, and Financial Secretary to the Treasury from 1942 to 1944. He was sworn of the Privy Council in the 1944 New Year Honours, and served as Chairman of the Conservative Party from 1944 to 1946.

After retiring from the House of Commons at the 1955 general election, he was raised to the peerage as Baron Clitheroe, of Downham in the County Palatine of Lancaster, on 21 June 1955. He succeeded his father as 2nd Baronet three months later.

He was appointed to be a deputy lieutenant of Lancashire on 16 November 1955, and later served as Lord Lieutenant of Lancashire, from 1971 to 1976. He was appointed a Knight of the Most Venerable Order of the Hospital of St. John of Jerusalem (KStJ) in February 1972, and appointed to the Royal Victorian Order as a Knight Commander in 1977 on his retirement from the Council of the Duchy of Lancaster.

== Family ==
He married Hon. Sylvia Benita Frances Hotham, daughter of Frederick Hotham, 6th Baron Hotham (1863–1923), on 24 January 1924. They had four children:

- Anne Assheton (born & died 1924)
- Hon. Bridget Assheton (1926−2004), who married Sir Marcus Worsley, brother of Katharine, Duchess of Kent
- Ralph John Assheton, 2nd Baron Clitheroe (1929−2026)
- Hon. Nicholas Assheton CVO (1934−2012), treasurer to Queen Elizabeth The Queen Mother from 1998 until her death in 2002

Lord Clitheroe died in 1984.

Parliament of the United Kingdom
Preceded by Sir Henry Betterton, Bt	Member of Parliament for Rushcliffe; 1934–1945	Succeeded by Florence Paton
Preceded by Sir George Broadbridge, Bt; Sir Andrew Duncan	Member of Parliament for City of London; 1945–1950; With: Sir Andrew Duncan	Constituency abolished
New constituency	Member of Parliament for Blackburn West; 1950–1955	Constituency abolished
Political offices
Preceded by Harry Crookshank	Financial Secretary to the Treasury; 1942–1944	Succeeded by Osbert Peake
Party political offices
Preceded by Thomas Dugdale	Chairman of the Conservative Party; 1944–1946	Succeeded by Lord Woolton
Honorary titles
Preceded by The Lord Rhodes	Lord Lieutenant of Lancashire; 1971–1976	Succeeded by Sir Simon Towneley
Peerage of the United Kingdom
New creation	Baron Clitheroe; 1955–1984; Member of the House of Lords (1955–1984)	Succeeded by Ralph Assheton
Baronetage of the United Kingdom
Preceded by Ralph Assheton	Baronet of Downham; 1955–1984	Succeeded by Ralph Assheton
