= Downham Hall =

Listed building in Lancashire, England

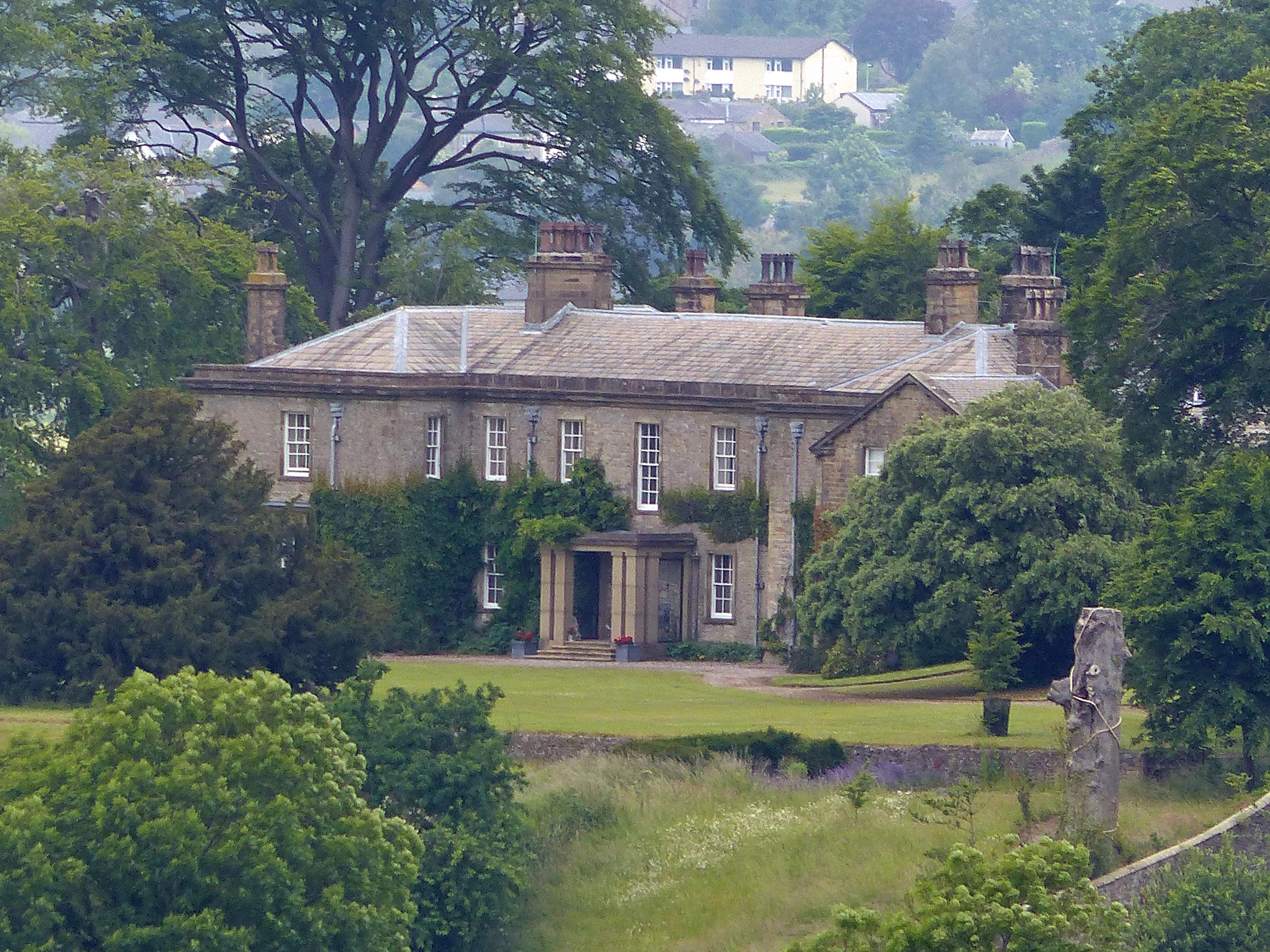

- Location within the Borough of Ribble Valley

General information
- Type: Country house
- Architectural style: Grecian
- Location: Downham, Lancashire, England
- Coordinates: 53.8946°N 2.3315°W
- Construction started: 1835

Technical details
- Material: Limestone and sandstone rubble with sandstone dressings and slate roof
- Floor count: 2

Design and construction
- Architect: George Webster

Listed Building – Grade II*
- Official name: Downham Hall
- Designated: 13 December 1977
- Reference no.: 1072125

Downham Hall is an English country house in Downham, Lancashire, England.

== Overview ==
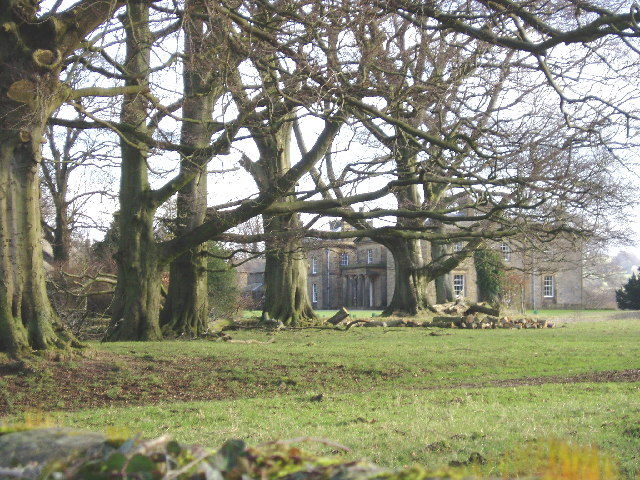
Alternative view

Downham Hall was designed by George Webster in 1835, though it was built on remains from the 16th century. It has two storeys and an attic. In terms of architectural style, it has Doric columns, window aprons, the shields of Henry de Lacy, 3rd Earl of Lincoln (1251–1311) and John of Gaunt, 1st Duke of Lancaster (1340–1399), a cornice, and architraves.

It is currently the private residence of the Assheton family, who have held the title Baron Clitheroe since 1955.

It has been a Grade II* listed building since 13 December 1977.

== See also ==
- Grade II* listed buildings in Lancashire
- Listed buildings in Downham, Lancashire
