= Assheton baronets =

There have been three baronetcies created for members of the Assheton family (pronounced Ashton), two in the Baronetage of England and one in the Baronetage of the United Kingdom. Two of the creations are extinct while one is extant.

- Assheton baronets of Lever (1620)
- Assheton baronets of Middleton (1660)
- Assheton baronets of Downham (1945), see Baron Clitheroe
