= Monumental inscription =

Words inscribed on a grave or memorial

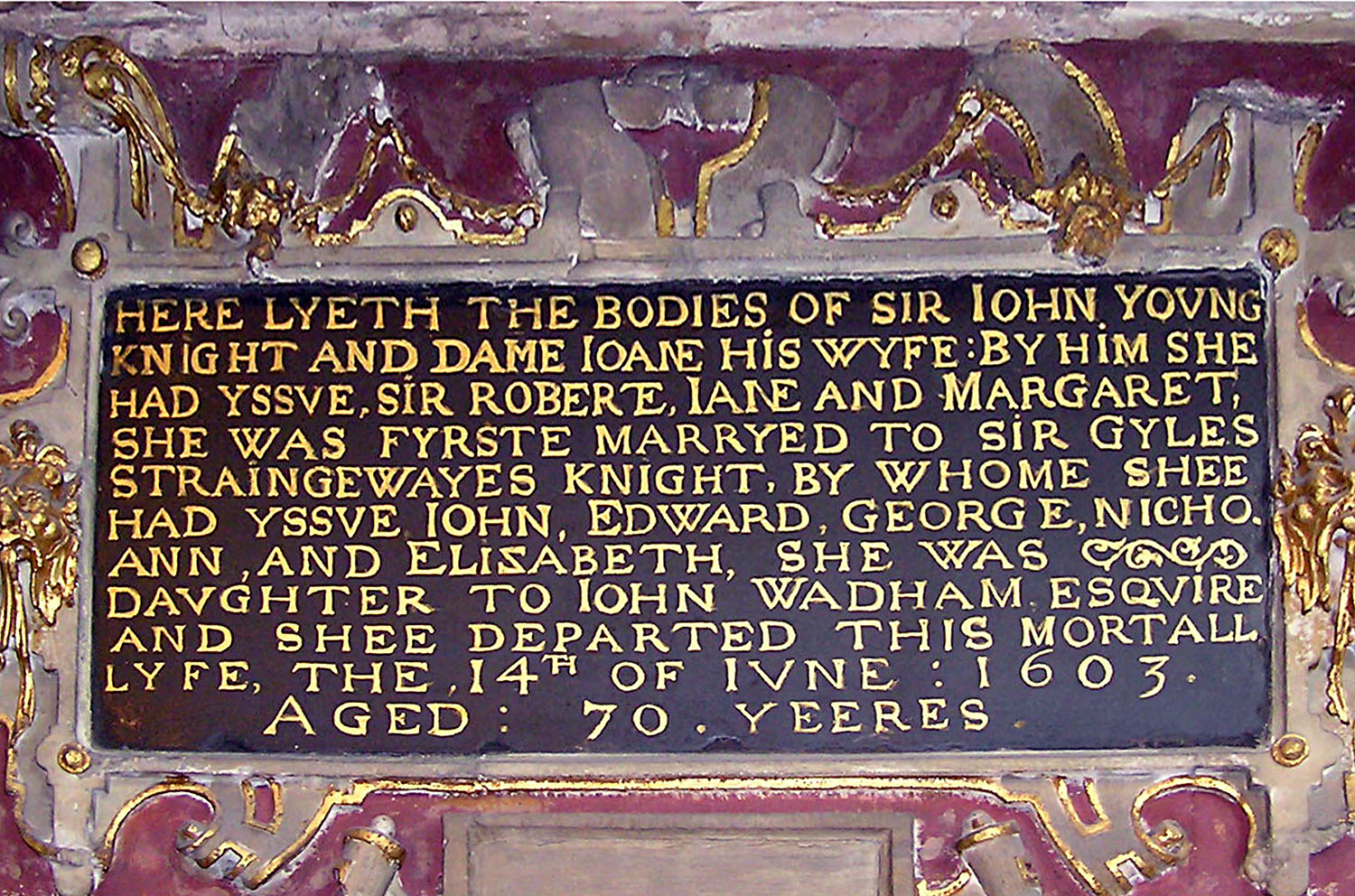
The inscription, carved in stone, on the monument of Sir John Young and Dame Joane, erected in 1606 in Bristol Cathedral, Bristol, England. Sir John entertained Queen Elizabeth when she visited Bristol in 1574 and was knighted by her.

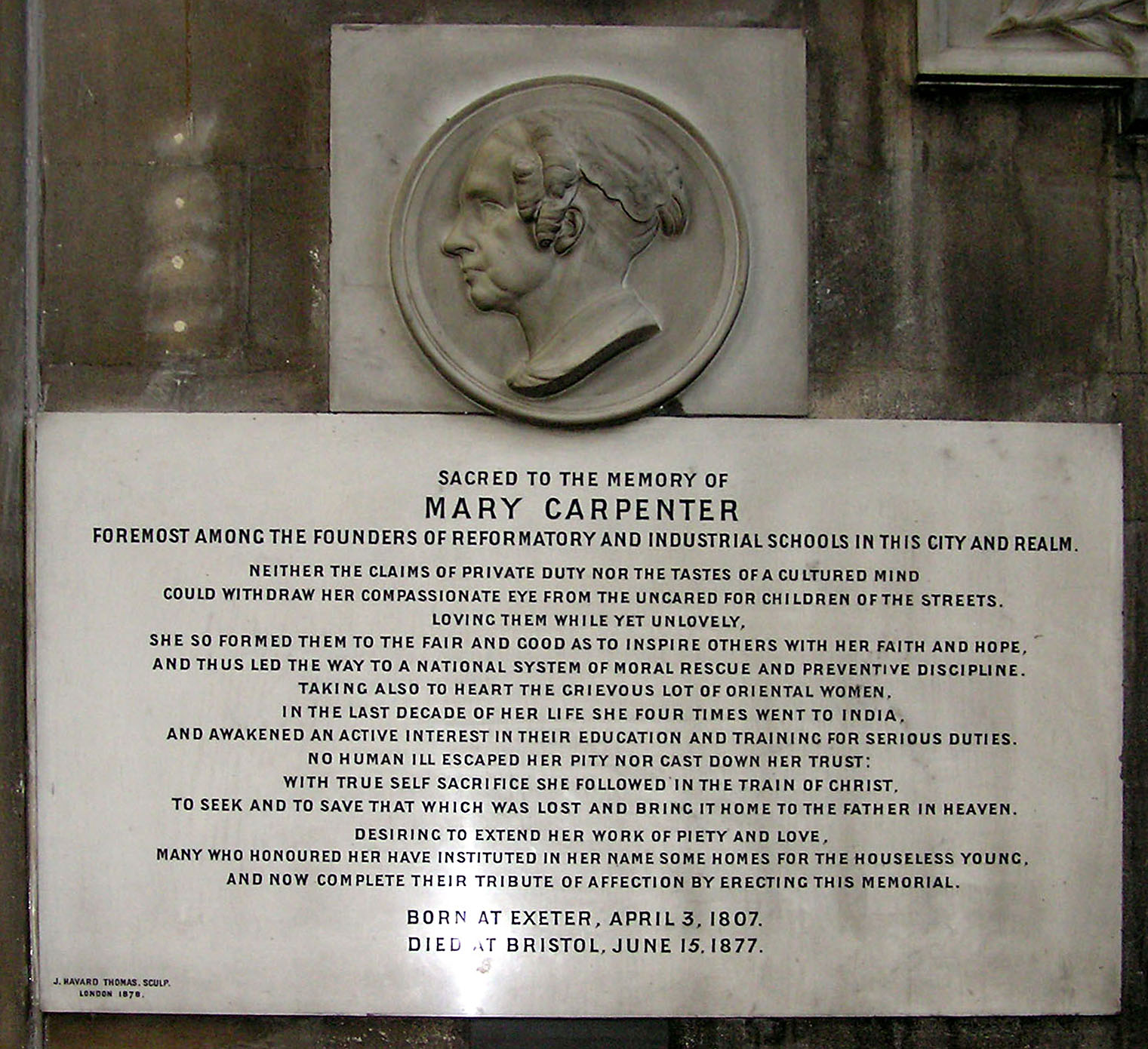
The memorial plaque to Mary Carpenter (1807-1877) in Bristol Cathedral, Bristol, England. In the mid-19th century the Bristol streets were full of homeless and destitute children 'on the border of a criminal or vagrant life.' Moved by their plight, she looked after them and started schools.

A monumental inscription is an inscription, typically carved in stone, on a grave marker, cenotaph, memorial plaque, church monument or other memorial.

The purpose of monumental inscriptions is to serve as memorials to the dead. Those on gravestones are normally placed there by members of the deceased's family. Those on memorial plaques inside a religious building are normally placed there by the wider community. The graves of those killed in wars and other armed conflicts are often placed together in military cemeteries in the country where the conflict took place; they are also remembered on war memorials in their own country.

Monumental inscriptions are important to genealogists and family historians, providing information on the subjects life and death, including dates. Family connections can sometimes be resolved as members of the same family may be buried together.

Many old gravestones are now illegible due to weathering, but individuals and family history societies may have recorded their inscriptions and published them, either online, on microfiche or in book form. In England, the Society of Genealogists has a large collection. The Commonwealth War Graves Commission has an online database of British and Commonwealth war graves and inscriptions.

== See also ==
- Behistun Inscription
- Chronogram
- Epitaph
- Monumental masonry (List)
