= List of monumental masons =

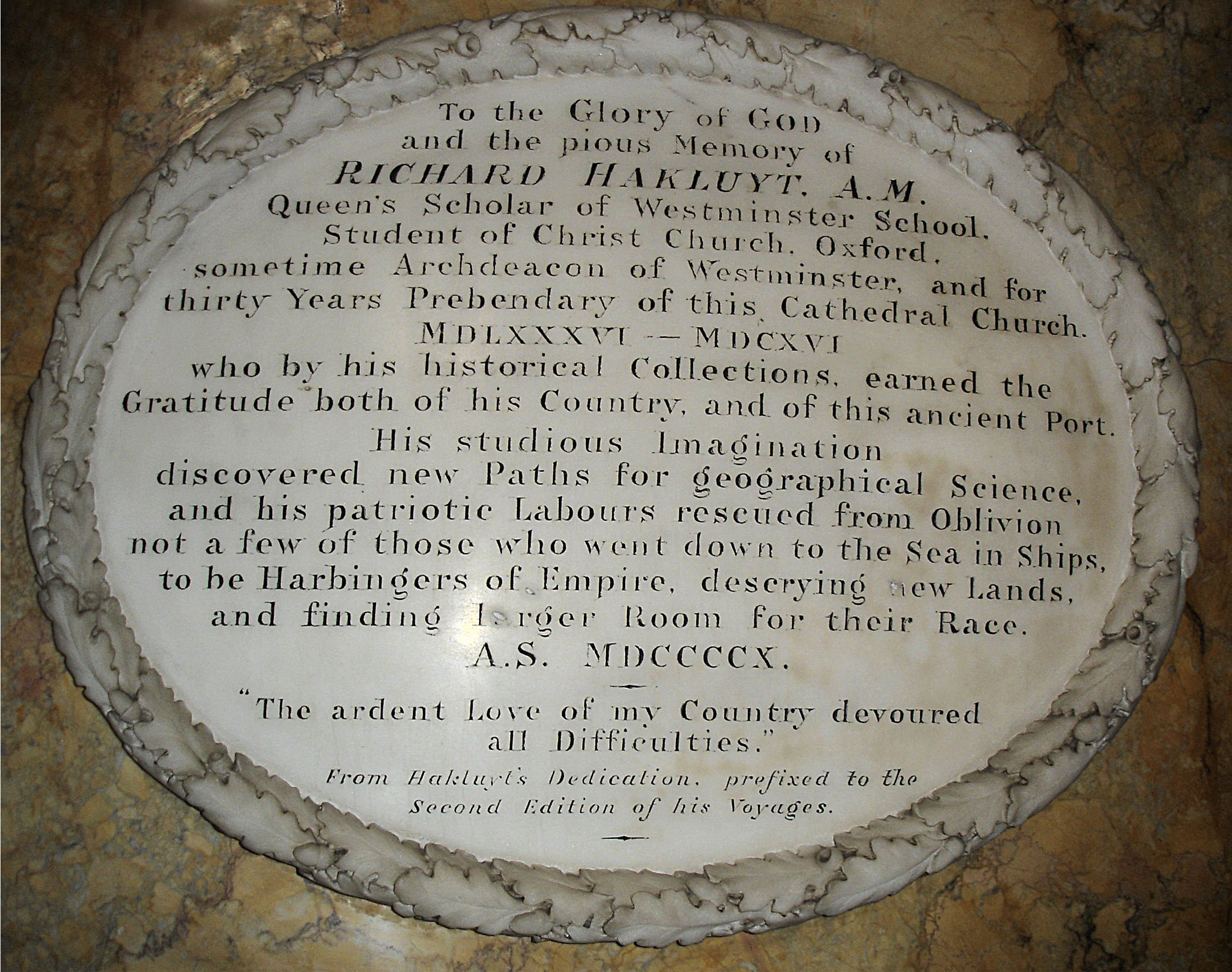
Richard Hakluyt's memorial

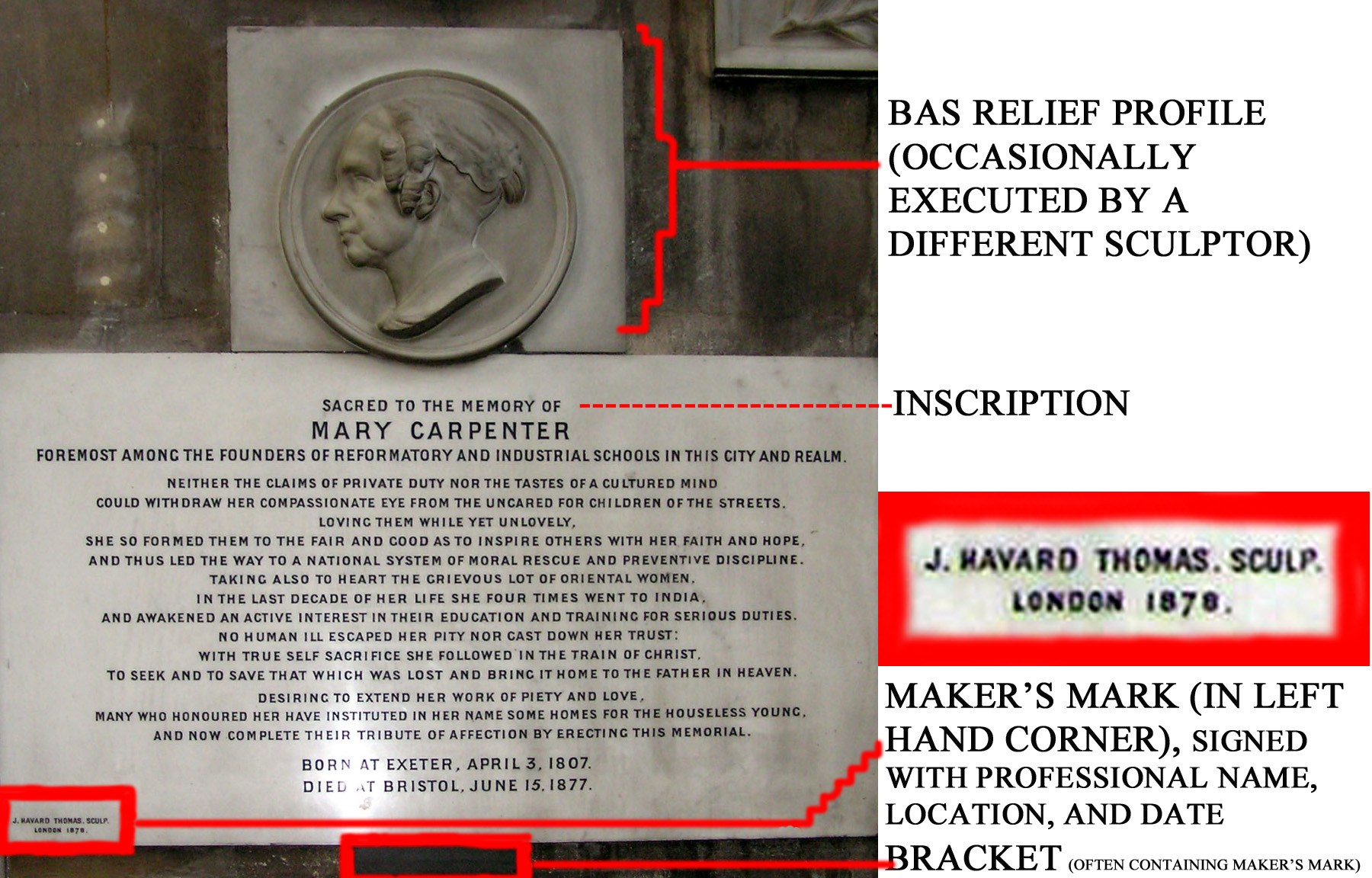
An example of a signed and dated maker's mark on a wall-mounted memorial to Mary Carpenter in Bristol Cathedral sculpted by James Havard Thomas of London

This is a list of monumental masons, also known as memorial masons, and gravestone carvers:

== A ==
- Bartlett Adams (1776–1828). Popular gravestone carver of Portland, Maine in the late 18th and early 19th centuries.
- Richard Adams (1784–1845). Popular gravestone carver who worked out of Portland, Bath, Brunswick, and Topsham, Maine, in the early 19th century. Brother of Bartlett Adams.
- Thomas Adye (mason), English, active in early-to-mid-18th-century England
  - Monument to William Mitchell (Huntingdonshire MP) (c.1703–1745) in St. Mary's Church (Fowlmere, Cambridgeshire).
  - Monument to Sir John Cotton (d.1712) in St. Nicholas' Church (Landwade, Suffolk).
  - Memorial to Hugo Raymond (d.1737) removed from the old "humble medieval village church" upon its replacement with the new St. George, Beckenham, Kent (1885–1887) in the south aisle, built by architect W. Gibbs Bartleet of Beckenham.
- J. Annis, English, active in early-to-mid-18th-century England
  - Memorial to John Styleman (d.1734) monument, "a large hanging one with cartouches of arms pinned to a pyramid, was erected after 1750" in St. Mary's Church, Bexley, Kent.
- John Wormald Appleyard, English, active 1851–1891.
  - Many cemetery monuments
  - Memorial to J.F. Longrigg, St Paul's, Shipley, West Yorkshire, 1890

== B ==
- J. Bacon and S. Manning of London, (also Bacon Junior and S. Manning), English, active in early 18th-century England
  - Monument to John Bones (d.1813) in St. Mary's Church (Fen Ditton, Cambridgeshire).
  - Memorial to James Antrobus Newton (d.1823), in St. Mary's Church, Stockport, Greater Manchester, depicting a kneeling female figure.
- John Bacon Jr. (of London, 1777–1859) (see above), English sculptor and monumental mason, active in early 19th-century England, son of John Bacon (1740–1799)
  - Memorial to Thomas and Sophia Lambard, "a pair of large, exceedingly restrained tablets by John Bacon Jun., 1813." In St. Peter and St. Paul, Ash, Kent.
- Gershom Bartlett (1723–1798). Prominent New England grave carver active between 1748 and 1798 in Bolton, Connecticut, and Pompanoosuc, Vermont.

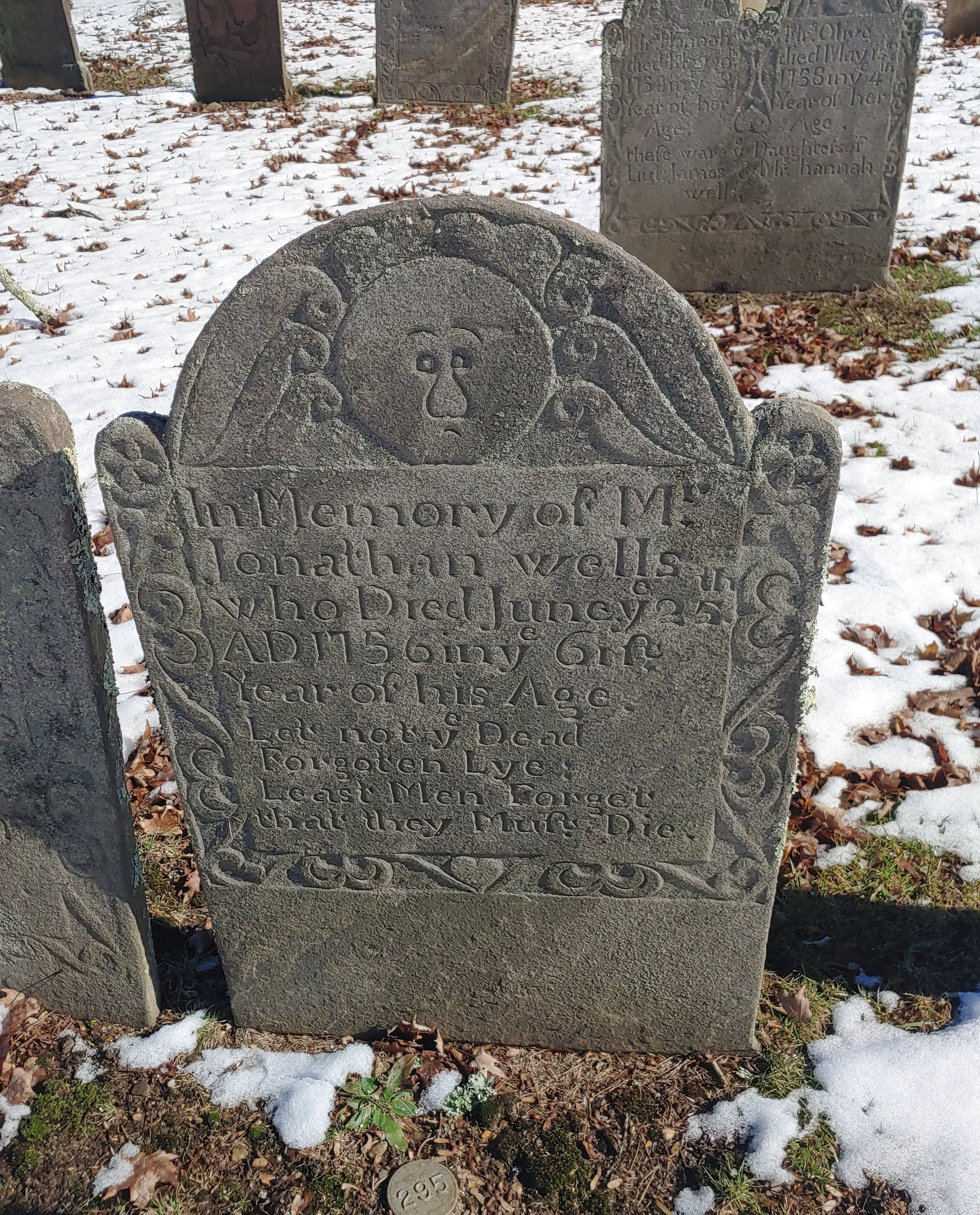
Tombstone dated 1756 carved by Gershom Bartlett

- Robert Beall (1836–1892) of Newcastle-upon-Tyne, England, sculptor of fonts, pulpits and reredoses. Also a monumental mason.
- Carlo Bergamini (1870–1934), Italian-New Zealander
- E. Bingham of Peterborough, English, active in early 18th-century Cambridgeshire.
  - Monument in Rococo style to R. Lane (d.1732) and Mrs. Lane (d.1754) in St. Mary's Church (Gamlingay, Cambridgeshire).
- Blore, English monumental mason, active in late-18th-century Cambridgeshire (designed a tablet in the north transept of Ely Cathedral).
- Miles Brien (alias O'Brien) (fl. 1782–1806) of Rathduff,"exemplifying the later eighteenth- and nineteenth-century Irish Churchyard Sculpture tradition in County Wexford."
  - Memorials in Ferns Cathedral graveyard.
- James Byrne (fl. 1775–1819) and Patrick Byrne (fl. 1795–1837) of Clone, Ireland "exemplifying the later eighteenth- and nineteenth-century Irish Churchyard Sculpture tradition in County Wexford."
  - Memorials in Ferns Cathedral graveyard.
- Boehm, English monumental masons active in mid-19th-century Cambridgeshire.
  - Monument to Mrs. Montagu (d.1871) in St. Margaret's Church (Newton, Cambridgeshire).
- Solon H. Borglum, sculptor and monumental mason active in 19th-century New York
  - Charles Adolph Schieren (1842–1915) in Green-wood Cemetery, Brooklyn, New York.
- Charles Bottomley, English, active in mid-18th-century England. Designer of the Gregory Wale, Esq. (d.1739) Memorial, known as the Obelisk on Maggots Mount in Harston, Cambridgeshire.
- John William Bowden (active 1920s), monumental mason of Matlock, signed as "BOWDEN MATLOCK".
- Solomon Strong Brewer (1746–1824), American monumental mason who worked in Western Massachusetts and New York
  - gravestones in the Old Dutch Burying Ground of the Old Dutch Church of Sleepy Hollow
- Bushnell, English, active in mid-17th-century Cambridgeshire
  - Monument to Richard Bennet (d.1658) and Sir Thomas Bennet (d.1667), two white, life-size standing figures against a black backcloth in St. Peter's Church (Babraham, Cambridgeshire).

== C ==
- Charles Calverley, famed sculptor and monumental mason active in 19th-century New York
  - Monument to Elias Howe Jr. (1819–1867), located at the intersection of Battle Avenue and Hemlock Avenue in Green-wood Cemetery, Brooklyn, New York.
- R. Chambers, English monumental mason active in mid-to-late-18th-century Kent.
  - Memorial to Richard Savage (d.1772), tablet with branches at the sides by Chambers who signed it in English and Hebrew, located in St. Peter's Church, Boughton Monchelsea, Kent.
- Tom Church, Scottish, (Brechin, Scotland), presently active, designer of the Wallace Monument
- Sir Francis Chantrey, English sculptor and monumental mason active in early-to-mid-19th-century England.
  - Memorial to Catherine Vansittart (d.1810), a "large hanging monument, this time with a profile medallion on a draped altar," attributed to Chantrey by style. It was removed from the old "humble medieval village church" upon its replacement with the new St. George, Beckenham, Kent (1885–1887) in the south transept, built by architect W. Gibbs Bartleet of Beckenham.
  - Monument to Samuel Knight (d.1829) in All Saints Church (Milton, Cambridgeshire).
- Sir Henry Cheere (1703 – 15 January 1781) was a renowned 18th-century English sculptor and monumental mason. He was "the first English-born sculptor to match the virtuosity of the continentals" and "formed his style on the small, crisp, cirvaceous shapes of the French sculptor [Roubiliac], though his monuments never approached Roubiliac's in ease and inventiveness. Much of his work is unsigned, as is his commonly considered c. 1760 masterpiece at Shadoxhurst, Kent.
- F. W. Commons was a monumental mason, trained in Europe (there is some speculation this was from 1858 to 1860), who was commissioned to carve four allegorical figures, each 12 ft high, for £2,100 to crown the front of Parliament House, Melbourne, though it never eventuated due to the depression. He set up as a monumental mason at Ballarat in 1880. He was then advertising from Creswick Road, "blue stone, granite and marble masonry, engraving, carving and sculpture" as well as "City and Garden sculpture". Much of his work can be seen in the historic buildings and gardens of Ballarat. A catalog of his work can be seen in F.W. Commons monuments, Libraries Australia ID 8859827.

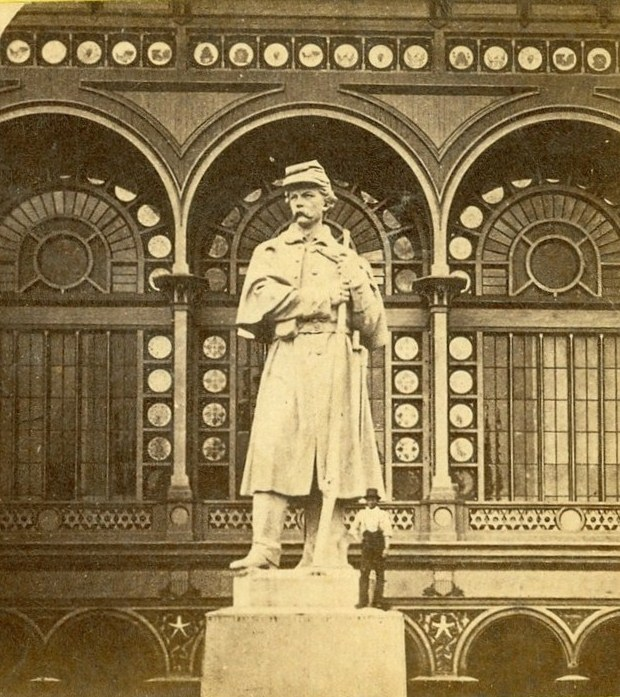
The American Volunteer, 1876. (Note man standing on base.)

- Carl Conrads (1839–1920), German-born American sculptor at New England Granite Works, Hartford, Connecticut.
  - The American Volunteer (1876) at Antietam National Cemetery, Sharpsburg, Maryland. The granite statue – 21 ft 6 in (6.55 m) tall; 44 ft 7 in (13.59 m) with base – was likely the largest sculpture in the United States prior to the Statue of Liberty.
  - Alexander Hamilton (1880), Central Park, New York City.
  - Many Civil War monuments.
- G. Cooper of Canterbury, English monumental mason active in the mid-19th century in Kent.
  - Memorial to Sir William Cosway Monument, a stone obelisk located quarter-mile west of St. Peter and St. Paul's Church, Bilsington, Kent. Cosway was a Member of Parliament for Kent "who fell off a stage coach here in 1835, and was killed. G. Cooper of Canterbury fecit. Struck by lightning" in the 1960s and thereafter threatened with demolition.
- John Cramb & Son, English monumental masons active in the 1880s in Camden, London.
- Joshua Cushing of Norwich, English monumental mason active in early 19th-century England.
  - Tablet to Charles Garneys d.1808 in Holy Trinity Church (Guilden Morden, Cambridgeshire).

== D ==
- H Daniel (active 1870s), English monumental mason of London.
- John Dixon of London, English monumental mason active in mid-to-late-18th-century England.
  - Wall-mounted obelisk memorial to Rev. Harry Trotter d.1766 in St. Botolph's Church (Graveley, Cambridgeshire).
- Durdles, the fictional monumental mason in Charles Dickens' The Mystery of Edwin Drood.

== E ==
- Joseph Edwards (1814–1882), Welsh

== F ==
- R B Farbridge (active 1890s), around South Shields, Tyne and Wear.
- John Flaxman, English monumental mason active in late-18th-century and early 19th-century England
  - Coffin-shaped tablet of Captain Serocold (d.1794) in St Andrew's Church, Cherry Hinton, Cambridgeshire.
  - Memorial to Frances Hoare (d.1800), a "Grecian tablet, notably severe by comparison with the earlier monuments. Mourning members of her family, contemporarily dressed, in relief on either side of inscription." It was removed from the old "humble medieval village church" upon its replacement with the new St. George's Church, Beckenham, Kent (1885–1887) in the north transept, built by architect W. Gibbs Bartleet of Beckenham.
  - Monument to Sir Charles Cotton, Admiral of the White (d.1812).
  - Monument to Mrs. E. Knight in All Saints Church (Milton, Cambridgeshire).
- John Franklin (d.1831), English, "monumental mason of local note whose tablets frequently appear in east Wiltshire and neighbourhood".
- John Frazee, carver active in mid-19th-century New York.
  - Charlotte Canda (1828–1845) monument in Green-wood Cemetery, Brooklyn, New York (with carver Robert Launitz).

== G ==
- E. Gaffin of London, English monumental mason of Regent Street, London active in the early 19th century
  - White marble sarcophagus memorial of Thomas Quintin (d.1806) in St. George's Church (Hatley St. George, Cambridgeshire).
- T. & E. Gaffin of London (see above), English monumental masons of Regent Street, London active in the mid-19th century
  - Memorial to Jemima Wilson (d.1865). "Still in the pre-Chatnrey tradition, with its female wreathing an urn with flowers. Signed by Gaffin, and poorly carved." It was removed from the old "humble medieval village church" upon its replacement with the new St. George's Church, Beckenham, Kent (1885–1887), built by architect W. Gibbs Bartleet of Beckenham.
- Geddes, Shakespeare & Co., 208 Girod Street, New Orleans, Louisiana
  - Sebastian Swoop Edifice (Mausoleum) in Greenwood Cemetery, New Orleans.
- Eric Gill (1882–1940), English monumental mason
- Francis Grigs, English monumental mason active in the mid-17th-century England
  - "Black and white marble tablet to Herbert Randolph, with Corinthian side pilasters, ostentatiously signed by Francis Grigs, Fecit Anno 1645." Located in All Saints Church, Biddenden, Kent.
- Robert Grumbold (d.1720), English, a mason with his own memorial in St Botolph's Church, Cambridge.

== H ==
- Christopher Horsnaile, English, monumental masons active in early eighteenth-century England (see also Edward Stanton
  - Monument to Bishop Fleetwood of Ely (d.1723) in north chancel aisle of Ely Cathedral.
- John Hickey, English monumental mason active in late-eighteenth-century England
  - Memorial to Amy Burrell (d.1790), a "hanging monument, large but detailed with delightful delicacy," removed from the old "humble medieval village church" upon its replacement with the new St. George's Church, Beckenham, Kent (1885–1887) in the south transept, built by architect W. Gibbs Bartleet of Beckenham.
- "Hooper, sculptor," English, active in late-19th-century Devon.
  - Wall-mounted memorial in Hatherleigh, Devon.
- Humphrey Hopper (active 1830s), English, active in Cambridge, Cambridgeshire
  - Memorial to the Rev. Charles Simeon d.1836 in Holy Trinity Church (Cambridge), "epitaph in Gothic forms."

== J ==
- Tim Johnson of Carving and Restoration Team in Manassas, Virginia, American stone carver presently responsible for the CIA Memorial Wall.
- Thomas Johnson Sr. (1689–1761) Prominent Gravestone carver of Cromwell, Connecticut, in the early to mid 18th century in Connecticut.
- Thomas Johnson Jr. (1718–1774) Son of Johnson Sr. and a prominent gravestone carver of Cromwell, Connecticut, through much of the 18th century in Connecticut.
- Thomas Johnson III. (1750–1789) Son of Johnson Jr. and a popular gravestone carver of Cromwell, Connecticut, in the later 18th century.
- Joseph Johnson, prominent gravestone carver of Windsor, Connecticut from the late 1730s until the early 1770s. Brother of Thomas Johnson Sr.
- John Johnson, prominent gravestone carver of Durham, Connecticut through the later 18th century and early 19th century. Not related to any of the Johnson carvers above.
- N Johnson, English monumental mason active in the early 17th-century Cambridgeshire, the monument of Sir Giles Allington (d.1613) and Lady Allington in All Saints Church (Horseheath, Cambridgeshire) is attributed to him.

== K ==
- D. Kindersley, English, active mid-20th century
  - Monument (completed 1947) to Mrs. Mary Robinson (d.1939) in St. Mary's Church (Dullingham, Cambridgeshire).

== L ==
- Robert Launitz, sculptor and monumental mason active in mid-19th-century New York
  - Do-Hum-Me, (1824–1843) "Indian Princess Monument." in Green-wood Cemetery, Brooklyn, New York.
  - Charlotte Canda (1828–1845) monument in Green-wood Cemetery, Brooklyn, New York (with carver John Frazee).
- Latham of Manchester, English monumental mason firm, active in mid-19th-century England
  - Memorial to Mrs Hawall (d.1852) in St. Mary's Church, Stockport, Greater Manchester, depicting angels hovering over her body.

== M ==
- J. Mallcott (of London), English monumental masons active in mid-19th-century London.
  - "A. W. Law, Esq." (d. 1824), wall-mounted memorial tablet (signed by Mallcott on the memorial underside) first erected in St. Matthew's Church, Friday Street, City of London, and removed 1883 to St. Vedast-alias-Foster, London, when St. Matthew's was demolished in 1885.
- S. Manning of London, see J. Bacon and S. Manning of London
- Midcounties Co-operative, English
- EH Mills, (active 1910s), monumental mason of Hampstead, London.
- John M. Moffitt, monumental mason, designer and sculptor active in mid-19th-century New York
  - Brown Family: Steamer Arctic Sinking (1854) located on Hillock Avenue within Serpentine Path Knoll, in Green-wood Cemetery, Brooklyn, New York.
- Monumental Bronze Company, American, Bridgeport, Connecticut, active between 1875 and 1912 with their subsidiaries in the United States and Canada manufactured rust-resistant white bronze (zinc) monuments.
  - Clarence D. MacKenzie (1849–1861) "Our Drummer Boy" Monument, located in Soldiers' Lot – Atlantic Avenue, between Meadow Avenue and Linden Avenue in Green-wood Cemetery, Brooklyn, New York.
  - Kurten Obelisk in Metairie Cemetery, New Orleans, Louisiana.
- Karl Muller, famed sculptor and monumental mason active in 19th-century New York
  - John Matthews (1808–1870), located on the Valley Avenue at Hill Side Path in Green-wood Cemetery, Brooklyn, New York.

== N ==
- T. Nichols, active in early 18th-century Cambridgeshire
  - Recumbent effigy with praying hands monument to Canon Selwyn (d.1875) of Selwyn College, Cambridge and the Selwyn Divinity School, Cambridge in south chancel aisle of Ely Cathedral.
- Samuel Nixon (sculptor), English monumental masons active in mid-19th-century London.
  - "Martha Hatch, daughter of Henry Emlyn of Windsor" (d.1838) first erected in St. Matthew's Church, Friday Street, City of London, and removed 1883 to St. Vedast-alias-Foster, London, when St. Matthew's was demolished in 1885.
- Noble, English monumental masons active in mid-19th-century Cambridgeshire.
  - Monument to Christopher Pemberton (d.1870) in St. Margaret's Church (Newton, South Cambridgeshire).
- J. Nolan (fl. 1824–1835) of Ferns, "exemplifying the later eighteenth- and nineteenth-century Irish Churchyard Sculpture tradition in County Wexford."
  - Memorials in Ferns Cathedral graveyard.
- John Nost (mason), English monumental mason active in late-17th-century and early-18th-century England.
  - Memorial to Sir John Banks (d.1699) in St. Peter's Church, Aylesford, Kent, "a stupendous pile of marble, rising to the roof. Sir John, in a wig, cravat, and semi-Roman dress, stands in an elegant pose by an urn on a tall pedestal. On the other side his wife, robed as a Roman matron, leans pensively on the pedestal. Below, their son, Caleb, reclines on his elbow, in Roman armour and wig. Backcloth held by flying putti, side pilasters, wide arching cornice and, at the very top, a garlanded cartouche of arms. Flowery Latin inscription. Everything indeed that could set a suitable seal on the career of a scucessful [sic] nouveau riche." attributed to the sculptor John Nost on grounds of style.

== O ==
- Anselm Odling, English, active early-to-mid-20th century, mentor to sculptor Roy Noakes.
- Francis O'Hara (architect) (1830–1900), Irish-American.
  - Jay Gould Family Mausoleum (1892), Woodlawn Cemetery (Bronx, New York).

== P ==
- Payne of St. Ives, English monumental mason from St. Ives practicing throughout England.
  - Urn memorial tablet of Robert Underwood d.1792 in St. Peter's Church (Boxworth, Cambridgeshire).
- Andrew Lang Petrie (1854–1928), Australian.
- Philip, English, active in 19th-century Cambridgeshire, England.
  - Executed a design by Sir George Gilbert Scott for the copper effigy of Dr. Hodge-Mill (d.1853) in the north aisle of Ely Cathedral.
- Physick, English monumental masons active in mid-19th-century Cambridgeshire.
  - Monument to Christopher Pemberton (d.1850) in St. Margaret's Church (Newton, Cambridgeshire).
- Elias Claeszoon Pickenoy (1565, Antwerp – 1640, Amsterdam), Dutch, father of Nicolaes Eliaszoon Pickenoy
- Pitbladdo, a four-generation family of Scottish masons, started by William Pitbladdo who established their monumental workshop in 1842 outside the gates of Green-wood Cemetery in Brooklyn, New York. Thomas Pitbladdo succeeded his father in the 1860s and 1870s, his son Grant Pitbladdo opened the shop outside Green-wood's eastern gate. Willard and Kenneth Pitbladdo were the fourth generation; all are buried in Green-wood.
- Presbrey Leland Incorporated, New York City
  - Pfizer Family Memorials: Emile Pfizer in Green-wood Cemetery, Brooklyn, New York (1866–1941).
- Richard Potter (c. 1800), "Builder and Monumental Mason".
- J. N. B. de Pouilly, blacksmith of New Orleans, Louisiana
  - The Sociedad Ibera de Beneficence Muerta tomb in St. Louis II Square, New Orleans.
  - Grailhe Gates in St. Louis II Square, New Orleans.
- Ambrose Poynter, English monumental masons active in early 20th-century England.
  - Mausoleum (1922) in St. Margaret's Church (Newton, Cambridgeshire).
- Pritchard, Builder (of London), English monumental mason firm active in early-to-mid-19th-century London, England.
  - A number of similar memorial tablets in St Botolph-without-Bishopsgate, City of London, including Jeffryes (c. 1836) and Webb (c. 1832).

== R ==
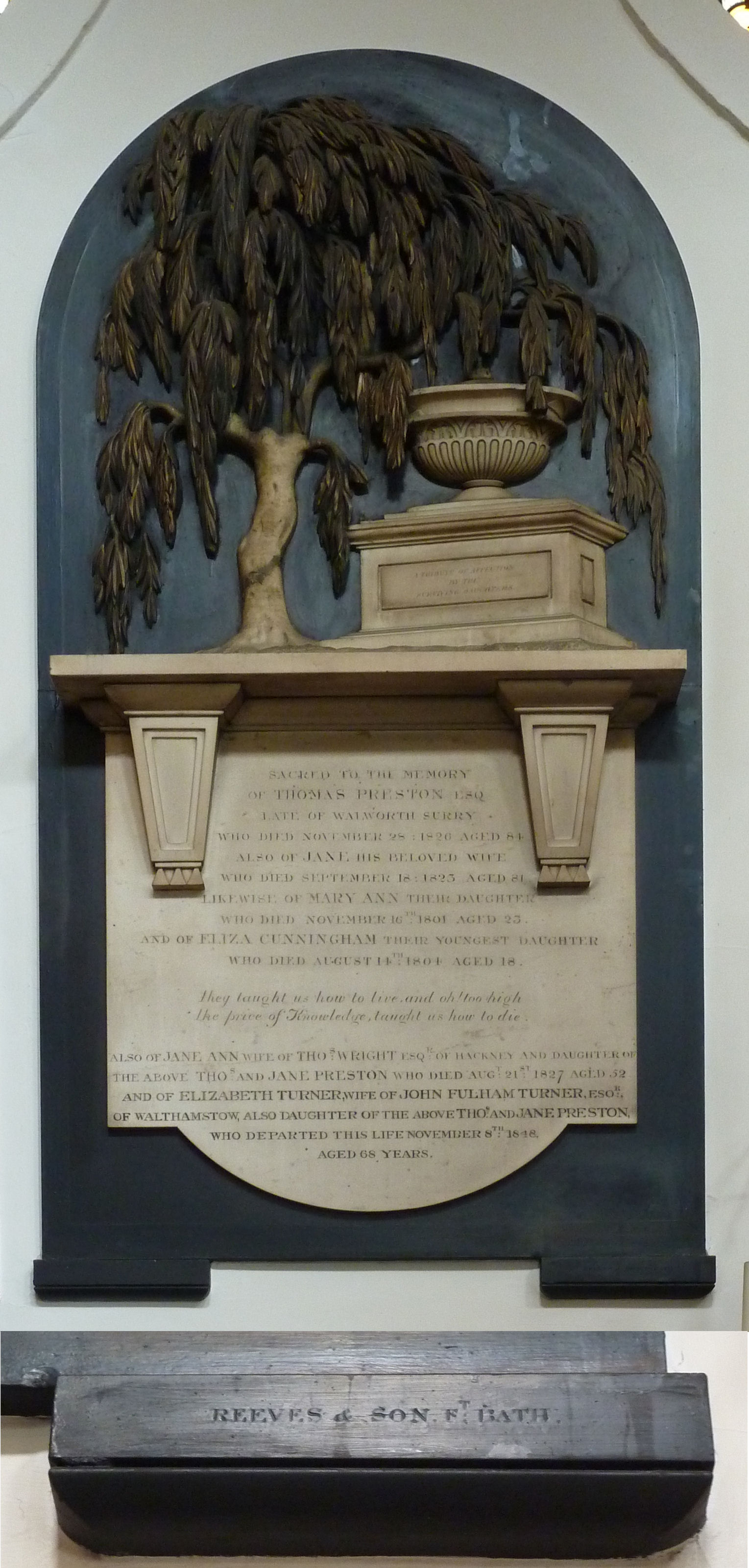
Wall-mounted memorial by Reeves of Bath of Thomas Preston Esq. (d.1820) and wife Jane (d.1823), their daughters, and many subsequent entries. The tablet was created c. 1820 but entries were inscribed until 1848. It features the willow tree motif, and is in the City of London Church of St Magnus-the-Martyr, near London Bridge.

- Thomas Rawlins (1727–1789) A Norwich-based monument mason with many examples of his work in several churches there.
- Reeves of Bath, English, active c. 1768 to the 1860s in Bath, Somerset

Cambridgeshire (with one tablet at St. Mary and St. John's Church (Hinxton, Cambridgeshire)).

- Wenzel Render, Czech, a monumental mason and privileged imperial architect, designer of Holy Trinity Column in Olomouc
- Rogers of Bath, English, active in 19th-century Bath, Somerset.
- Frank Rusconi (1874–1964), Australian
- Sidney Robinson (retired), English stonemason and craftsman active in the Norfolk Norwich area

== S ==
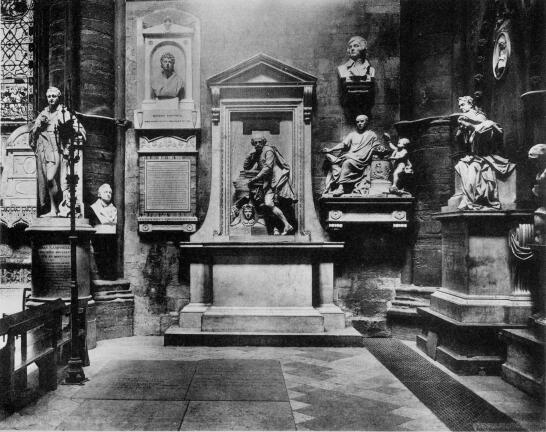
Scheemakers's Shakespeare memorial in Westminster Abbey

- Peter Scheemakers (1691–1781), Flemish Roman Catholic sculptor who worked from 1716 in London, Great Britain
  - Monument to Canon Fleetwood of Ely, Cambridgeshire (d.1737) in north chancel aisle of Ely Cathedral.
  - Executing the William Kent-designed sculptural monument to William Shakespeare, erected 1740 in Poets' Corner in Westminster Abbey, London.
  - Monument to John Dryden in Westminster Abbey, London.
  - Memorial to Sir Christopher Powell (d.1742), in St. Peter's Church, Boughton Monchelsea, Kent. "Grandiose but firgid standing monument. White marble figures in Roman dress. He reclines on his elbow on a black sarcophagus, his mother standing on one side, his wife bending towards him on the other. The faces of them are unattractively coarse and podgy."
  - Memorial to Sir John Norris, a hanging monument with a bust dated 1750 in St. George's Church, Benenden, Kent.
- Mr. Charles Selby, Builder, English, active in mid-19th-century England)
  - The Albert Memorial, Abingdon, 1863.

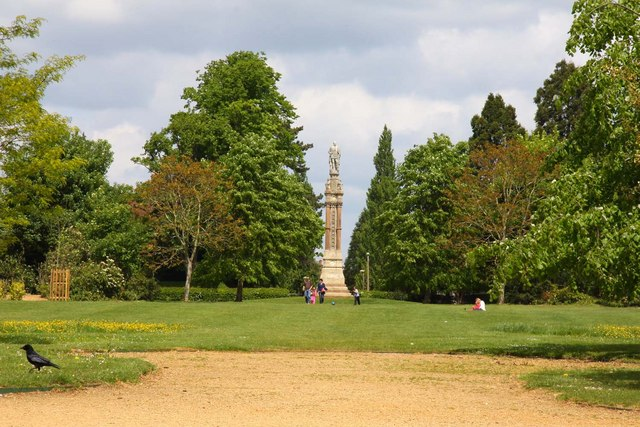
View of Albert Park looking north to the monument to Prince Albert in the distance

- Shout of Holborn, English, active in early 19th-century England.
  - Monument to Mrs. Mary Crop (d.1808) in St. Mary's Church (Dullingham, Cambridgeshire).
- Daniel Sephton of Manchester, ‘Feeit(?)', English, active in mid-18th-century England.
  - Wall-mounted memorial of Sarah Jarvis, wife of Samuel Jarvis, Esq. (1711?—17 July 1748) in Chester Cathedral.
  - Memorial to William Wright (d.1753) in St Mary's Church, Stockport, Greater Manchester.
- R. Sheppard Marble and Stone Works, 171 Queen Street, Toronto, Ontario. Active in 19th-century Ontario. "This number now lies approximately at the junction of Queen Street and University Avenue, an area of eight-lane divided macadam and massive granite buildings. The number 171 no longer exists."
- William Stanford (1837–1880), Australian,
- Charles Stanley, English, active in mid-18th-century England.
  - Executed a monument Humphrey Smith (d.1743), designed by John Sanderson in the cloister of Ely Cathedral.
- Edward Stanton (sculptor) of London (1681–1734), an Englishsculptor and monumental mason, and monumental mason active in early 18th-century England, and son of William Stanton (mason)
  - Monument to Bishop Fleetwood of Ely (d..1723) in north chancel aisle of Ely Cathedral.
  - Monument to Sir Marmaduke Dayrell and his mother
- Thomas Stanton, English monumental mason active in mid-17th-century England.
  - Memorial to Robert Heath (d.1649), a set of alabaster reclining figures, Robert is robed as a judge. "Thomas Stanton agreed to make a monument in 1664, and only charged 60 pounds,"according to the late Rupert Gunnis. The memorial is in the north aisle of St. Martin's Church, Brasted, Kent.
- William Stanton (mason) of London ((1639–1705), father of Edward Stanton (sculptor), was an English monumental mason active in late-seventeenth-century England.
- William Stead, (early 1800s), carver and monumental mason of York, England
- The John Stevens Shop of Newport, Rhode Island. Founded by John Stevens Sr. in 1705 and remains active.
- Nicholas Stone, English sculptor, builder, mason, monumental mason to the Royal Court
  - Memorial to Sir Francis Barnham (d.1634), only two calcined busts survive high in the north aisle of St. Peter's Church, Boughton Monchelsea, Kent.

== T ==
- James Havard Thomas, sculptor active in late-nineteenth-century England
  - Wall-mounted memorial to Mary Carpenter in Bristol Cathedral, 1878
- Tucker, Mason, English, active in or around nineteenth-century Bath, Somerset.
- Treasure, Mason, English, active in or around nineteenth-century Bath, Somerset.
- Samuel Thatcher (1825–1899), monumental mason, Taunton, Somerset. Active – mid to late 19th century.

== V ==
Harold Vogel, American stone carver who created the first 31 stars. of the CIA Memorial Wall and its inscription when the Wall was created in July 1974.

== W ==
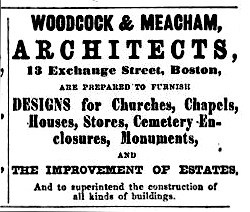
1862 advertisement for Woodcock & Meacham, Architects

- Uzal Ward (c. 1726–1793), American monumental mason, leading master of the Newark (New Jersey) school of stone carving
- Henry Weekes (14 January 1807–1877), English sculptor and monumental mason, best known for his portraiture. He was among the most successful British sculptors of the mid-Victorian period.
  - Memorial to William, Lord Auckland (d.1814), "Grecian tablet with a profiule medallion in very low relief. Carved in 1849 by Henry Weekes" It was removed from the old "humble medieval village church" upon its replacement with the new St. George's Church, Beckenham, Kent (1885–1887) in the south transept, built by architect W. Gibbs Bartleet of Beckenham.
- White, English, active in or around 19th-century Bath, Somerset)
- Mr. G. P. White of London, English, active in mid-19th-century England)
  - The Chesapeake Memorial, Portsmouth, 1863.
- Paton Wilson, English,
  - brass tablet of R. Booth Campbell-Brown d. 1893 in the Arts and Crafts style, set in St. Mary the Great (Cambridge).
- Wilton, English monumental mason, active in late-18th-century Cambridgeshire, who designed the monument to Elizabeth Bacon and her brother Peter Standly in St. Mary's Church (Linton, Cambridgeshire)
- Winslow Brothers Company of Chicago, Illinois, foundry active in the 1890s.
- Richard Westmacott the Elder (1747–1808), sculptor and monumental mason active in late-18th-century England.
  - Memorial to Mrs. Elizabeth Jeaffreson (d.1778) in St. Mary's Church (Dullingham, Cambridgeshire).
  - Standing wall monument to Christopher Jeaffreson (d.1789) in St. Mary's Church (Dullingham, Cambridgeshire).
- Sir Richard Westmacott the Younger (1775–1856) RA, renowned sculptor and monumental mason.
  - Memorials to William Pitt the Younger and Charles James Fox in Westminster Abbey
  - Memorial to Sir George Warren (d.1801) in St. Mary's Church, Stockport, Greater Manchester, depicting a standing female figure by an urn on a pillar.
  - Memorial to Mary, Countess of Darnley (d.1803), a "sarcaphogus with scrolls at the ends and putto heads, with half-spread wings" in the churchyard north of the chancel of St. Lawrence, Bidborough, Kent.
  - Memorial to John Turton (d.1806) was the doctor of King George III of Great Britain. His heavily Grecian memorial tablet in St. Martin's Church, Brasted, Kent, features Doric columns beside the inscription and a sarcophagus. On the latter books and serpent-entwined staff. It was designed and carved by the renowned Sir Richard Westmacott.
  - Memorial to Mary Turton (d.1810), a "relief of a classically robed man leaning pensively on an altar 'To Gratitude.'"
  - Memorial to Lt. General Christopher Jeaffreson (d.1824) (by Sir Richard Westmacott) in St. Mary's Church (Dullingham, Cambridgeshire).
  - Memorial to Rev. Charles Prescott (d.1820), showing a seated effigy. in St. Mary's Church, Stockport, Greater Manchester.
  - Memorial to Commander Charles Cotton (d.1828) at St. Mary Magdalene's Church (Madingley, Cambridgeshire).
  - Memorial to William Pemberton (d.1828) at St. Margaret's Church (Newtown, Cambridgeshire).
- Richard Westmacott III RA (1799–1872)
  - The tomb of Philip Yorke, 3rd Earl of Hardwicke at St Andrew's Church in Wimpole, Cambridgeshire
  - Monument commemorating Sir John Franklin's lost Arctic expedition of 1845, now in the Chapel sacristy at Greenwich Hospital, south-east London
- Joseph Wilton, English monumental mason active in late-18th-century England,
  - Memorial to Stephen Hooker (d.1755), memorial executed after 1788 and features a "tall, slender ahnging monument of white marble, detailed with exceeding refinement."
- Robert Wood & Co. Makers Phila of Philadelphia, Pennsylvania
  - Pelton Tomb (with maker's mark on the door) in Greenwood Cemetery, New Orleans.
- Wood and Miltenberger of Philadelphia, characterized by vermiculated rustication on corners and sides and additional classical ornament on cast-iron mausoleum
  - Miltenberger Tomb (attributed to Wood and Miltenberger) in Greenwood Cemetery, New Orleans.
- Woodcock and Meacham, architects and monumental masons in Massachusetts formed by Woodcock and George F. Meacham (1831–1917).
- W. Wright, English, active in mid-17th-century Cambridgeshire.
  - Monument to Dorothe and Lionel Allington (d.1638).

== Y ==
- Yang Bin (mason) (born c. 1963), Chinese, monumental mason in Zhenwu Shan cemetery.

== Z ==
- John Zuricher (active 1740s to 1784), the most prolific gravestone carver in colonial New York City and the Province of New York
  - gravestones in the Old Dutch Burying Ground of the Old Dutch Church of Sleepy Hollow
