= Norwich Company of Comedians =

The Norwich Company of Comedians was an acting company based in Norwich, East Anglia, during the 18th and 19th centuries. They used to perform on what was known as the Norwich Theatre Circuit, which consisted of an annual tour of six theatres.

They were a professional, respected and comfortably-off band with better than average wages and popular headquarters at the White Swan inn. The company was treated with deference in every town it visited. Unusually, a good relationship had matured between the Norwich Theatre manager and the local magistrates, who under normal circumstances had little time for players. At some towns, when the season was drawing to a close, the town clerk would even send a note of congratulation to the troupe; and by 1804, relations had progressed along such a friendly path that Lord Chedworth was recorded as having left legacies of between £13,000 and £14,000 to members of the company. Norwich owed its place among the top five provincial circuits in England to its dramatic tradition.

== White Swan Inn ==
The White Swan Inn, near St. Peter Mancroft Church, Norwich, was the company's permanent home from 1731 to 1757 and soon became known as the White Swan Playhouse. The first reference to the group of actors who were to form the main part of the Norwich circuit appears in 1726. For a decade, they went by the name of "The Duke of Grafton's Servants", a patron of the company in the early eighteenth century. In 1736 they assumed the cumbersome title of "The Norwich Company of Comedians, Servants to His Grace, the Duke of Grafton, Lord Chamberlain to His Majesty's Household".

== Plays ==
The Company were careful to perform plays soon after their London première, reinforcing their professionalism by presenting the most recent plays possible. For instance, King Charles I by William Harvard appeared in the same month in London and Norwich in 1737. John Gay's The Beggar's Opera, new to London in January 1728, was performed to Norwich audiences three months later, and taken soon after to Bury St Edmunds, Colchester and Ipswich.

== Thomas Ivory ==
The era of prosperity began in 1758 when local architect Thomas Ivory became proprietor of the circuit. In 1758, Ivory built Norwich its first proper theatre, a miniature Drury Lane Theatre.

== Actors ==
- Benjamin Plim Bellamy
- George Bennett, father of George John Bennett
- Harriet Bennett (née Morland)
- Robert Drury (1713–1741), uncle of Joseph Drury, headmaster of Harrow School
- John Saville Faucit, father of Helena Faucit
- Harriet Faucit (1789–1857), mother of Helena Faucit
