= Bath Abbey Cemetery =

Cemetery in Bath and North East Somerset, UK

Coordinates: 51.3701°N 2.3481°W

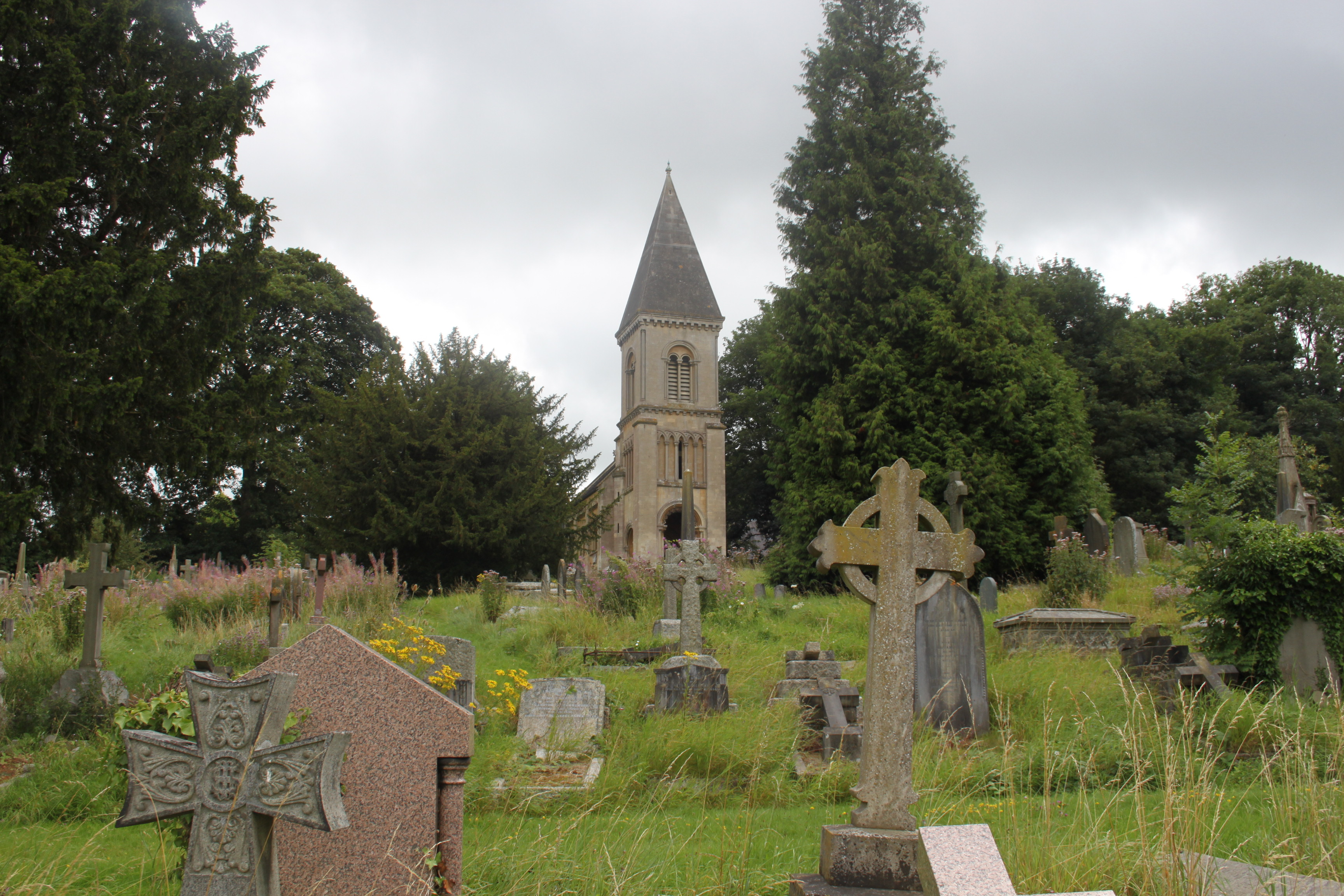
Bath Abbey Cemetery

The Anglican Bath Abbey Cemetery, officially dedicated as the Cemetery of St Peter and St Paul (the patron saints that Bath Abbey is dedicated to), was laid out by noted cemetery designer and landscape architect John Claudius Loudon (1783–1843) between 1843 and 1844 on a picturesque hillside site overlooking Bath, Somerset, England.

The cemetery was consecrated on 30 January 1844. It was a private Anglican cemetery financed by W. J. Broderick, Rector of Bath Abbey.

The layout is a mixture of formal and informal arranged along a central avenue. It features a mortuary chapel, designed by Bath City Architect G. P. Manners in the then fashionable Norman Revival architectural style.

== History ==
The cemetery is on a site that was used for Roman burials, three stone coffins and Roman coins dating to Constantine the Great and Carausius having been found when the roadway to the chapel was constructed. In 1952 a further Roman coffin was discovered during the removal of a tree root from a footpath.

The eccentric William Thomas Beckford was originally buried here, but moved when his former retreat of Lansdown Tower came under threat of becoming a pleasure garden and was transformed into Lansdown Cemetery in the parish of Walcot. "The best monuments are slightly neo-Grecian with canopied tops, dating from the 1840s. Note that to S. M. Hinds d.1847 signed Reeves, the Bath firm of Monumental masons, that flourished from c.1778 to 1860…."

The cemetery and mortuary chapel are Grade II* listed. 37 monuments in the cemetery are Grade II or II* listed. A general trend is that the most elaborate monuments belong to individuals formerly residing at the most exclusive addresses. An interesting trend seems that clerics get Gothic Revival style monuments and military men typically get Greek Revival style monuments.

The Roman Catholic Perrymead Cemetery is adjacent to Bath Abbey Cemetery.

== Mortuary chapel ==
The three-bay double-height chapel was built in 1844 to designs by George Phillips Manners in the Norman Revival architectural style with a prominent west tower over a three-sided open porch / porte cochere. The chapel is built above a crypt and was planned to be flanked by open cloister wings containing a columbarium and loculi. Ever since the cemetery's closure, the chapel has also been closed and is in a deteriorating condition. It was listed Grade II historic building on 5 August 1975, but is now Grade II* listed. It remains owned by Bath Abbey, although a lease or sale was considered to Bath's Orthodox church, which never materialized.

== List of prominent memorials ==
- Crimean War Memorial, c. 1855, an obelisk memorial of polished stone designed in the Greek Revival style.
- Robert Scott of 3 Duke Street, St James, c. 1861, a white marble memorial designed in the Gothic Revival style
- Elizabeth Hunt of 72 Pulteney Street, c. 1846, a polished stone obelisk designed in the Gothic Revival style
- Robert Harvey Forsmann of St Petersburg (records infant death), of 15 Bennet Street, Walcot, a white marble memorial designed in the Greek Revival style
- Doverton Chalmers Greetree Swan of Island of Ceylon (Sri Lanka) (records infant death) of 36 Pulteney, a white marble memorial designed in the Greek Revival style
- John Gill (also Louise Gicnac) of 14 Bathwick Street, c. 1851, a white marble memorial designed in the Greek Revival style
- Francis Hunt of 65 Pulteney, c. 1851, a memorial designed in the Greek Revival style
- Gen. Paul Anderson of 10 Paragon Buildings, a polished stone memorial designed in the Greek Revival style
- Joseph Chaning Pearce of Montague House. Lambridge, c. 1847 (House became a museum to his 200 fossil collection), a polished pink granite, and polished stone plinth, designed in the Greek Revival style (Signed Rogers of Bath)
- Sidney P. Macgreggor of Widcombe House, Widcombe, c. 1855, a marble memorial designed in the Gothic Revival style (signed by Tucker, mason)
- Ellen Maria Lamb of New Bond Street, St Michael's, c. 1856, a polished stone memorial, designed in the Greek Revival style
- John Pavin of 5 Cavendish Crescent, Walcot, c. 1848, a white marble memorial designed in the Greek Revival style
- Julius Hall of 45 Pulteney Street, c. 1869, a white marble memorial obelisk designed in the Gothic Revival style
- Charles Pratt of Combe Grove Manor, c. 1844, a white marble mini temple memorial designed in the Greek Revival style
- Henry John Sharpe, Merchant of New York, of Royal Hotel, St James, Doric Column on Pediment WM- designed in the Greek Revival style (Signed by Treasure Mason)
- John Collingridge of 57 Pulteney Street, c. 1855, a memorial designed in the Greek Revival style
- James Weeks Williams of 6 Claremont Place, Walcot, c.1848, a marble classical revival mini temple (signed White) "The Williams Memorial is a white marble miniature open Greek temple raised up on a penant stone pedestal. Four painted sets of fluted columns with lotus and acanthus leaf capitals support a canopy over a draped urn flashed by an angel and a female mowner. The equally elaborate inscription is to Jane Wiliams who died at her residence, 17 Kensington Place, Bath, in 1848 aged 88. One side of the base commemorates 17-year-old Henry Williams, ‘who by accidentally falling off the West India docks in a dense London fog was unfortunately drowned’ in 1853." (Listed II*)
- Stothert (Family) of Hay Hill, c. 1855, a polished stone memorial designed in the Greek Revival style
- ??daria Lady Hargood of Royal Crescent, c. 1849, a memorial designed in the Gothic Revival style
- Elizabeth Ingram of 11 South Parade, c. 1845, a memorial designed in the Norman Revival architectural style
- Samuel Maxwell Hinds of 7 Raby Place, a white marble memorial designed in the Greek Revival style (signed Reeves)
- Mary Ann Hunter of 7 Edward Street, c. 1869, a white marble cross memorial designed in the Gothic Revival style
- Robert Neale of Butt Ash Cottage, Widcombe, c. 1873, a white marble obelisk designed in the Gothic Revival style
- Ann Partis of 58 Pulteney, c. 1846, founder of Partis College, a white marble memorial designed in the Greek Revival style (Listed II*)
- Lt. Col. Richard Tatton of Blyth, Northumberland, c. 1867, a white marble obelisk designed in the Greek Revival style
- Eleanor Moody of Pulteney Street, c. 1844
- Edwin Augustus Lawton of St Mary's Buildings, Lyncombe, c.1863, a white marble headstone designed in the Gothic Revival style
- Capt. Peter Gapper of Easton Home, Beechen Cliff, c. 1866, a white marble obelisk designed in the Greek Revival style
- Charles Hamper of the Grove, Bathampton, c.1866, a polished stone memorial designed in the Gothic Revival style
- Rose Caroline Browne of Bathampton, c. 1858, gabled memorial designed in the Gothic Revival style
- John Hay Clive of Hastings (late of Bathwick Hill), c. 1853, a memorial designed in the Greek Revival style
- Charles Rainsford Hall of Bathampton, c. 1848, a memorial designed in the Greek Revival style
- Benjamin Plim Bellamy of Beacon Hill, Walcot, c.1847, a polished stone monument designed in the Greek Revival style (Signed Reeves)
- Charles Richardson (briefly) of New Bond Street, c. 1890 (drowned in River Avon), a polished stone memorial designed in the Greek Revival style
- William Westall of 1 George's Place, Bathwick Hill, c. 1853, a polished stone obelisk memorial, designed in the Greek Revival style
- Rev. Edward Tottenham of Marlborough Buildings, Walcot, c. 1853, a polished stone memorial designed in the Gothic Revival style
- Rev. Nathan Ashby of Combe Down, (same as Tottenham above), a polished stone memorial designed in the Gothic Revival style
- John Monk Lambe of 3 Sydney Buildings, c. 1865, a memorial designed in the Greek Revival style
- Rear Admiral John Bythesea, died 1906, Crimean War Victoria Cross recipient, tall Celtic granite cross.
- Arnold Ridley, actor, ashes buried in parents' grave

== War graves ==
The cemetery contains 3 Commonwealth service war graves of World War I, registered and maintained by the Commonwealth War Graves Commission – a British Army Captain, a Canadian soldier and a Royal Air Force airman.
