= St George's Church, Beckenham =

St George, Beckenham
- Beckenham Parish Church
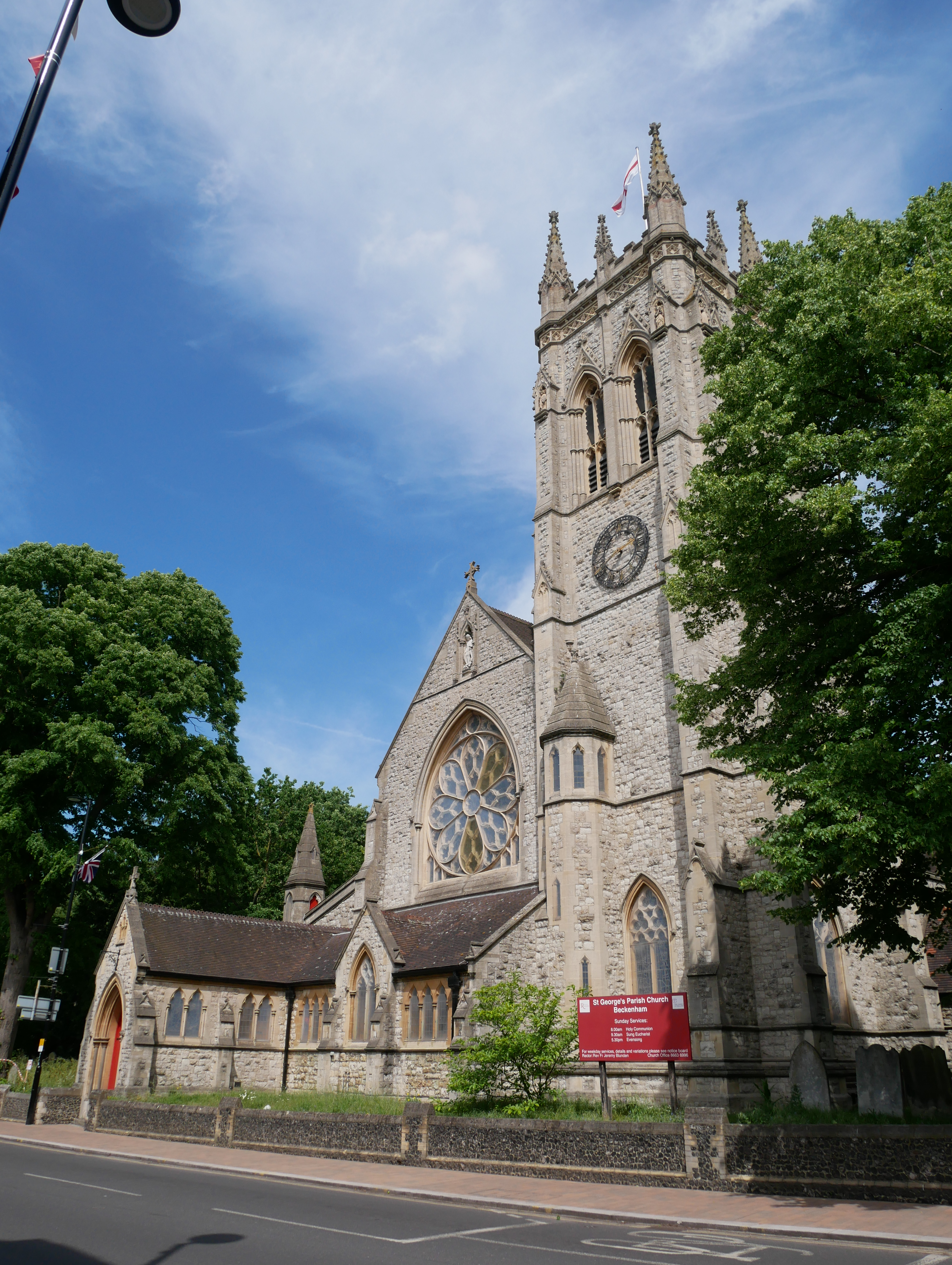
- West face of St George's Church, Beckenham
- St George, Beckenham
- 51.4092°N 0.0247°W
- OS grid reference: TQ 37477 69644
- Location: High Street, Beckenham, Kent, BR3 1AX
- Country: England
- Denomination: Church of England
- Churchmanship: Affirming Catholic
- Website: www.stgeorgesbeckenham.co.uk

Architecture
- Architect: W. Gibbs Bartleet
- Style: Victorian
- Years built: 12th century (rebuilt 1885-1887)

Administration
- Diocese: Rochester
- Archdeaconry: Bromley and Bexley
- Deanery: Beckenham
- Parish: Beckenham

Clergy
- Rector: Jeremy Blunden

Listed Building – Grade II*
- Designated: 28 May 1954
- Reference no.: 1054025

St George's Church, Beckenham is the Church of England parish church of Beckenham, Greater London (until 1965, Kent). It is Grade II* listed.

St George's Church is the principal parish church, and is in the centre of Beckenham. Originally medieval, it has been extensively rebuilt. It has a 13th-century timber lychgate that is said to be the oldest in England.

== History ==
The church was originally built in the twelfth century and survived as a humble medieval church until it was rebuilt between 1885 and 1887 as a “confident town church” by local architect W. Gibbs Bartleet in ragstone with ashlar dressing. The pinnacled southwest tower is the focal point of the High Street and was completed in 1902–1903. The church sustained damage in the Second World War as a result of two V-1 flying bombs, on 2 July and 27 July 1944. The modern stained glass was created between 1963 and 1966 by Thomas Freeth.

== Building ==
The church is built in the Decorated style of the early 14th century. The most prominent feature is the tower, built in four stages with angle buttresses and terminating in an embattled parapet with pinnacles at the corners and also in the middle of each side.

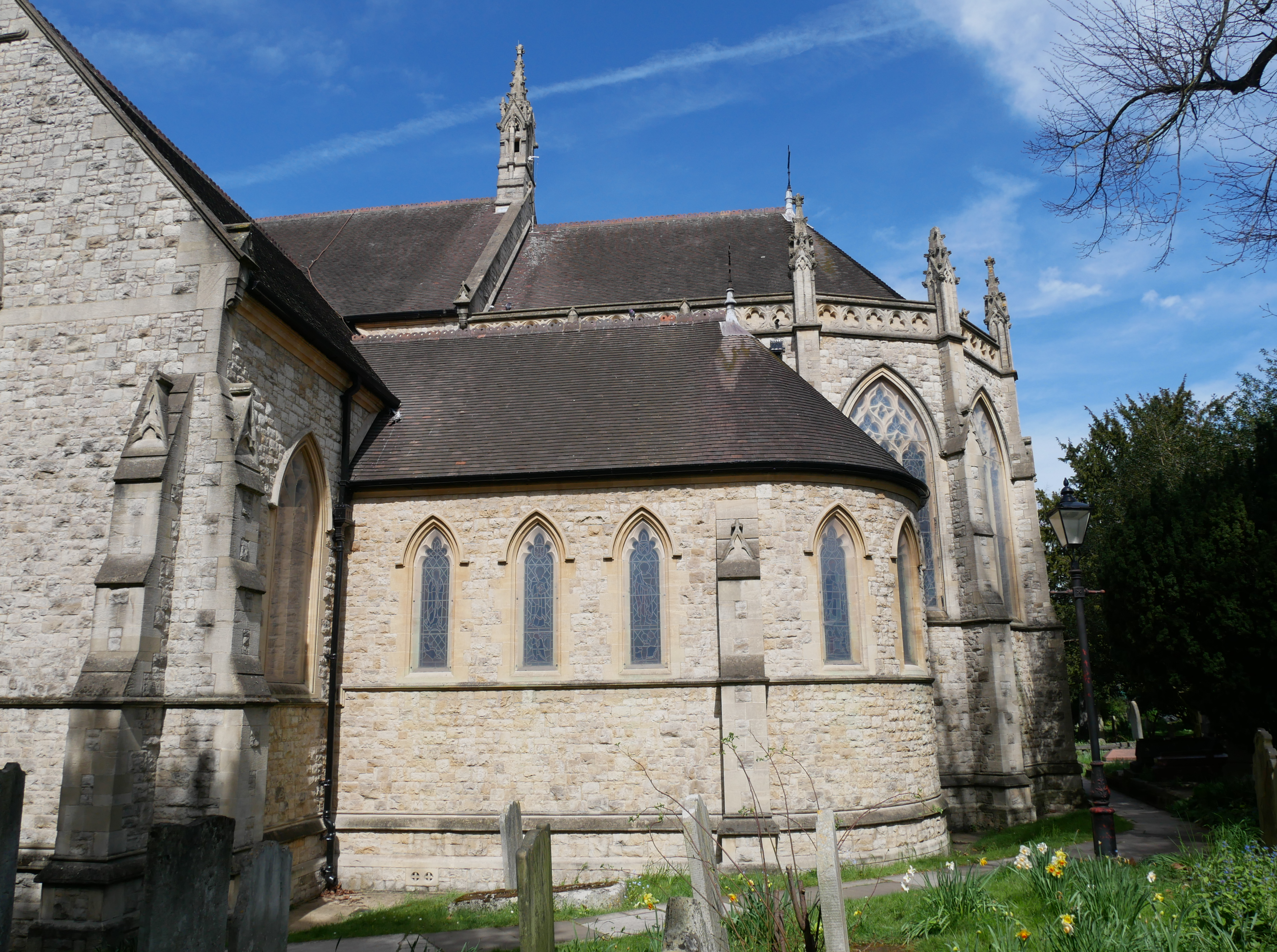
The east end of the south face of the church

Across the West end of the nave is a narthex with a gabled head in the centre. In the west wall of the nave is a very large window filled with a circle of intricate flowing tracery. The nave has a clerestory with pairs of two light windows in each bay with flowing tracery while the lean-to aisles have three-light windows with varied Decorated tracery. The transepts have large windows with a transom: each has a different design in the tracery but in both cases based on a circle. At the east end the chancel has a low parapet pierced with trefoils, a five-sided apse and crocketed pinnacles at the angles of the apse. The roof over the nave has hammerbeams and that over the chancel is a keel shape.

The oldest feature is a much-damaged square 12th- or 13th-century baptismal font. It had originally been in the old church (taken out c1801 and returned 1876). The font in use today is a conventional octagonal Victorian one. In the apse of the Lady chapel is a piscina with credence shelf that also came from the previous church. Extensive amounts of the Victorian pewing and stalls remain. The pulpit is polygonal, has open sides and stands on a stone base of 1906.

There is Victorian stained glass in a number of windows, notably the large west window and that in the south wall of the south transept. Much was lost in World War II and extensive replacement took place from c1960. The artist was Thomas Freeth, an art teacher at Beckenham Art School. His first work was the west window in the former baptistry and his designs fill the apse windows and thirteen other windows throughout the church.

The numerous monuments, many of outstanding quality by monumental masons such as Thomas Adye, John Hickey, John Flaxman, Sir Frances Chantrey, Henry Weekes and Gaffin, were transferred from the old church to the new, as was the church plate. William, Lord Auckland has his memorial within the church and was buried in the churchyard, which features a number of good eighteenth-century gravestones.

== Notable clergy ==
- John Newey, later Dean of Chichester, was a curate from 1692 to 1693
- Peter Bishop, later Chaplain-in-Chief of the RAF, was a curate from 1971 to 1975
- Anne Dyer, later Warden of Cranmer Hall, Durham, was a SSM from 1988 to 1989
- 2nd Baron Milverton, curate from 1957 to 1959
- David Silk, later Anglican Bishop of Ballarat and then a Roman Catholic priest, was Rector from 1975 to 1980

== Gallery ==
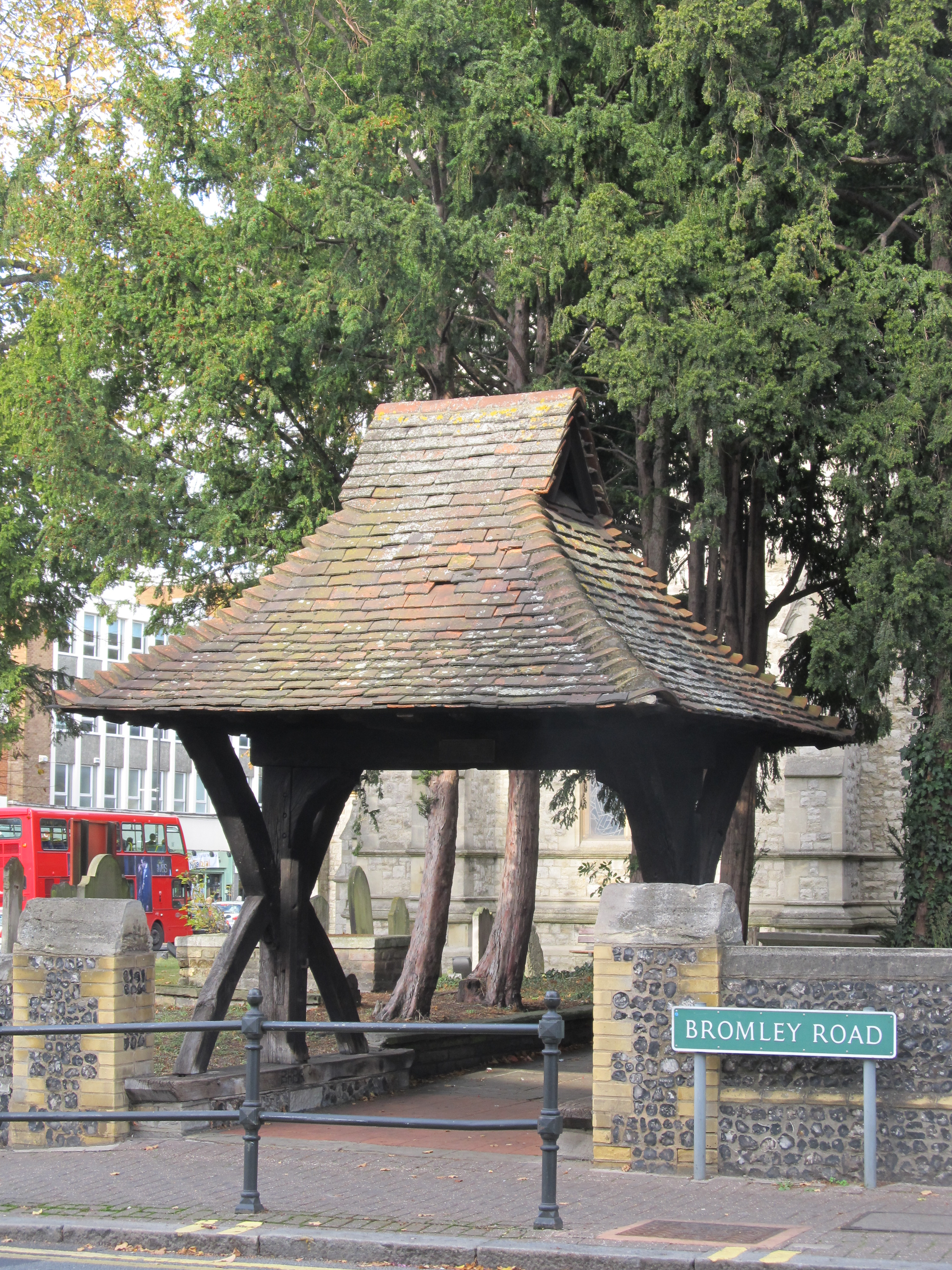
Lych gate

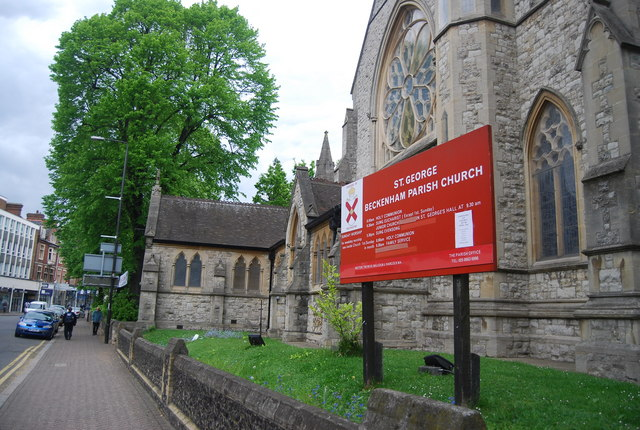
Church sign

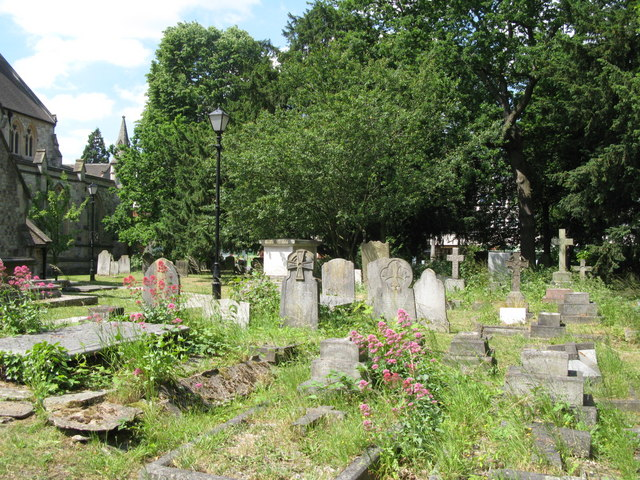
Churchyard

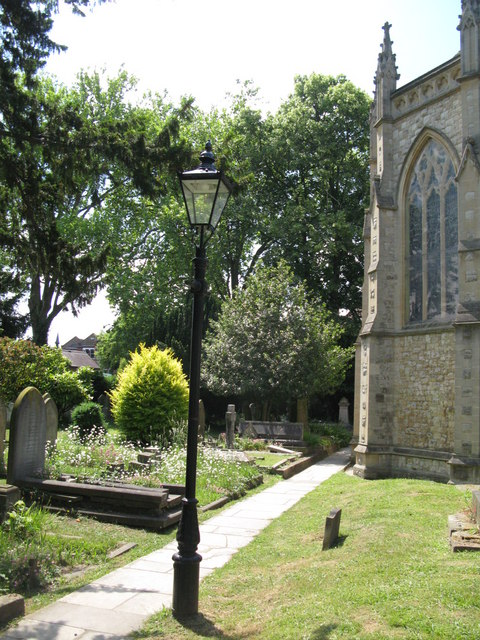
Churchyard

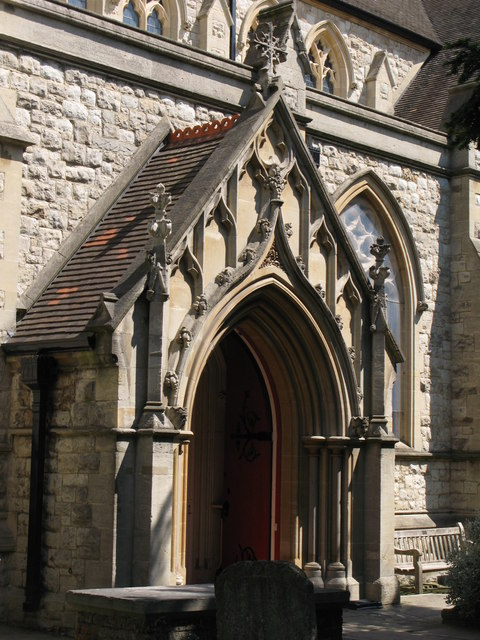
Porch

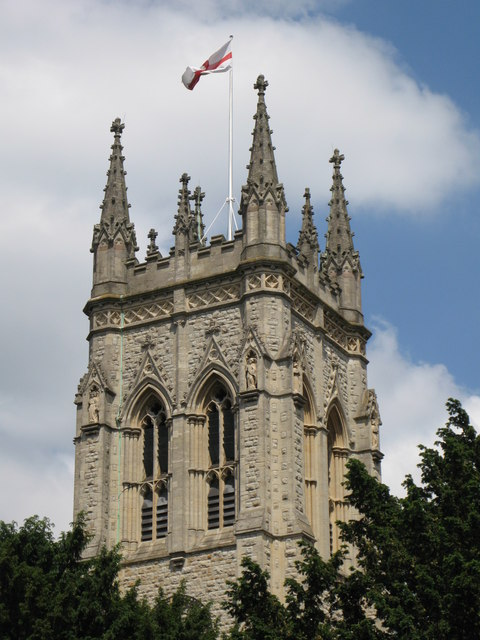
Tower detail

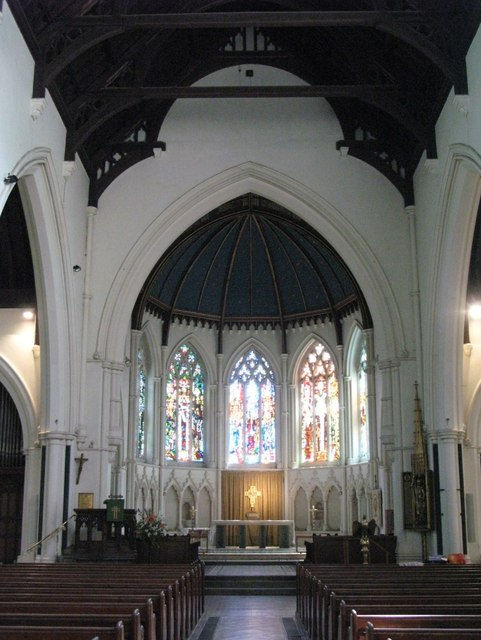
Chancel

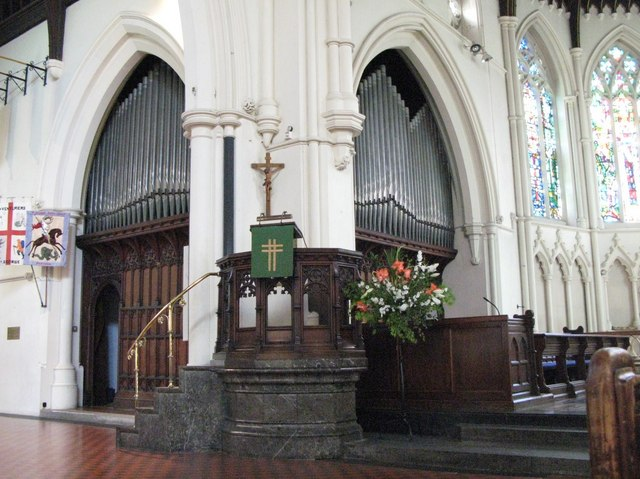
Pulpit and organ

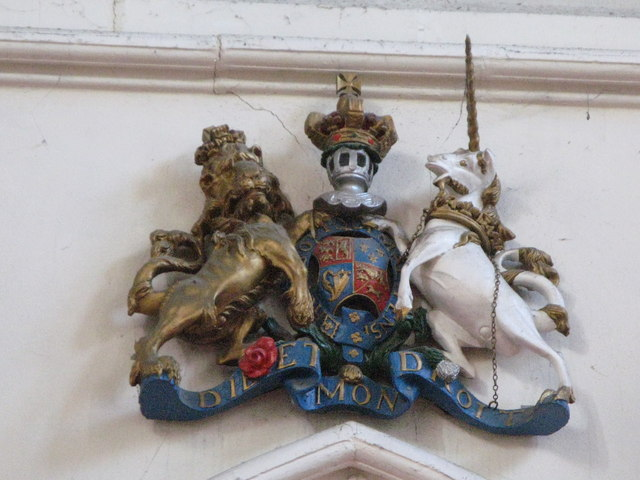
Royal arms

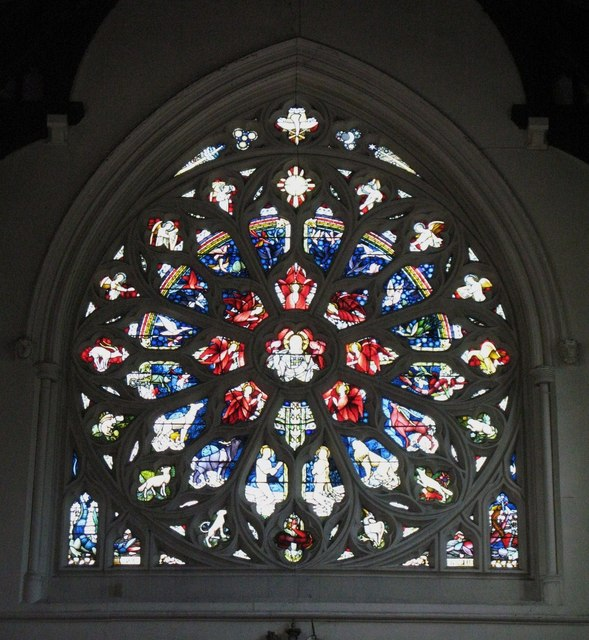
Rose window at west end

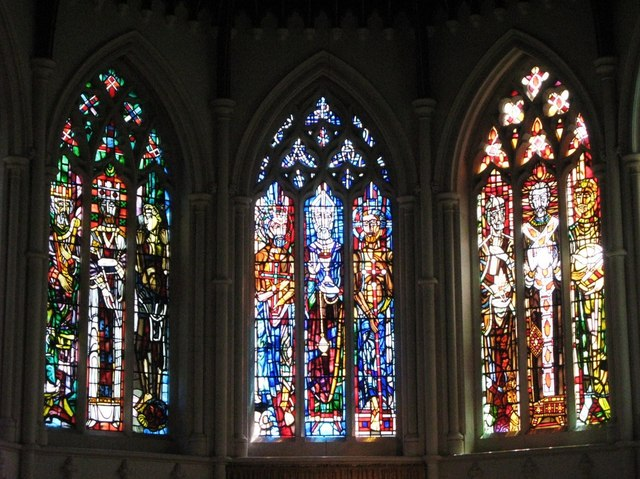
Windows at east end
