= Thomas Freeth =

Thomas Freeth (1912–1994) was an English stained glass artist and art teacher active in the mid-twentieth-century in Kent. He was a local of Beckenham, Kent, and taught art there.

During World War Two, Freeth served as a Sapper in the Royal Engineers. Throughout the conflict, Freeth continued to paint and four of his war-time paintings were purchased by the War Artists' Advisory Committee.

Among Freeth's glass designs were the complete set of nave and tower windows for St. George's Church, Beckenham, which replaced windows destroyed in the war.
