= Reeves of Bath =

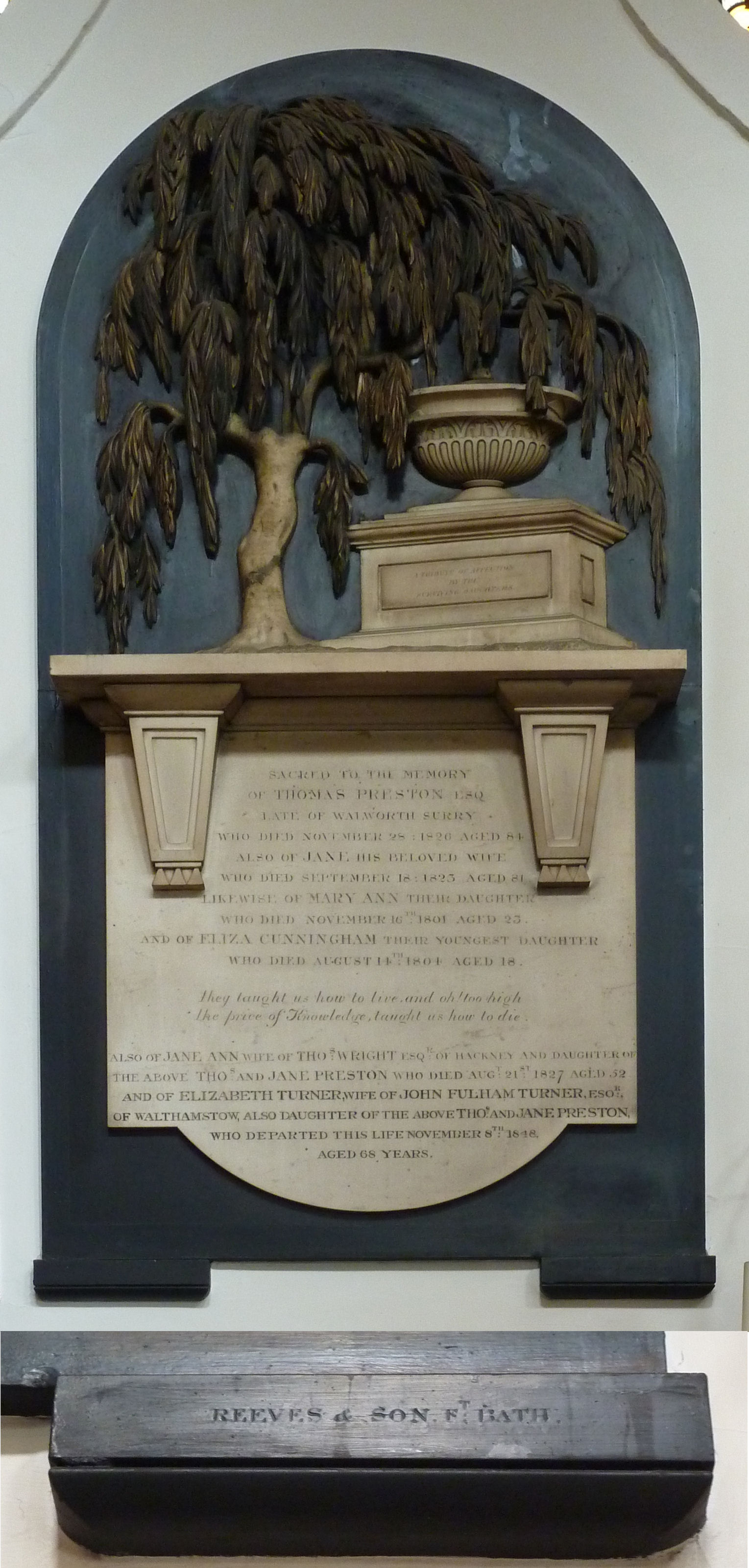
Wall-mounted memorial of Thomas Preston Esq. (d.1820) and wife Jane (d.1823), their daughters, and many subsequent entries. The tablet was created c.1820 but entries were inscribed until 1848. It features the willow tree motif, and is in the City of London Church of St Magnus-the-Martyr, near London Bridge.

Reeves was the most prominent firm of monumental masons (tombstone carvers) in Bath, Somerset. They flourished from c. 1778 to the 1860s. They often signed their work with "Reeves," or occasionally "Reeves & Son of Bath" when commissioned outside of Bath. One memorial is in the Grade I-listed City of London church St. Magnus the Martyr.

== List of works ==
- 1786, Thomas Stokes, marble tablet in St Mary's Church Yate
- 1799, Nathaniel Osborne, marble tablet in St Mary's Church, Tormarton
- 1807, Simon Wayte marble tablet in Church of St Mary, Rodbourne Cheney, Swindon
- 1820, Thomas Preston Esq. (d.1820) and wife Jane (d.1823), their daughters, and many subsequent entries until 1848. It features the willow tree motif, and is in the City of London Church of St Magnus-the-Martyr.
- 1841, George Whittington marble tablet in Holy Trinity Church, Cold Ashton
- c.1847, Benjamin Plim Bellamy Monument in Bath Abbey Cemetery
- c.1847, Samuel Maxwell Hinds Memorial in Bath Abbey Cemetery
- c.1847, Joseph Chaning Pearce Memorial in Bath Abbey Cemetery
- 1851, William Bevan Gwyn monument in Church of St Cain, Llangain

== Contemporary Monumental Masons in Bath ==
- Rogers of Bath
- Tucker, Mason
- Treasure, Mason
- White
