= Thomas Ivory =

English builder and architect (1709–1779)

Thomas Ivory (1709–1779) was an English builder and architect, active in Norwich.

== Life ==
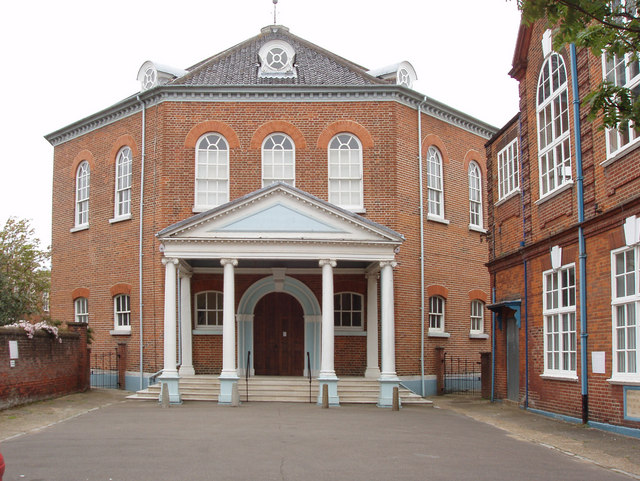
Octagon Unitarian Chapel, Norwich.

Ivory was born in 1709. His early years and education remain obscure. His earliest recorded large commission was in his capacity as a builder and timber merchant at Thrigby Hall in 1735. He bought the freedom of Norwich in 1745 and was appointed carpenter the Great Hospital in the city in 1751. In May 1750 he had put his house in the parish of St Martin-at-Oak for sale. He then leased a piece of land on the west forecourt of the Great Hospital on which he built a substantial residence for himself, into which he moved in 1756. It is now known as St Helen's House. He went on to build the Assembly House (1754), the neighbouring theatre (1757, since destroyed), the Methodist meeting-house in Bishopsgate Street (1752–3), the Octagon Chapel in Colegate (1754–6) and the artillery barracks (1771). He was also responsible for various houses in the city.

Between 1767 and 1779, along with two members of his family, his son William and his nephew John Ivory, he built a new range at Blickling Hall, closing in the open courtyard in a style sympathetic to the existing Jacobean house.

In addition to work as a builder and architect, Ivory carried on an extensive trade importing timber, with his own yard in Bishopsgate. He also operated the Norwich Theatre, and is recorded as having obtained a licence for his company of actors, the Norwich Company of Comedians, to perform in Norwich in 1768.

Ivory died at Norwich on 28 August 1779 and was buried in Norwich Cathedral, where he is commemorated by a wall monument made by his nephew John Ivory. In his will he is described as ‘builder and timber merchant.

== Family ==
Ivory married Hannah Lacey (who died in 1787) on 22 December 1735. They had two sons: William, who assisted his father as an architect, and died in King Edward VI Almshouses, Saffron Walden, on 11 December 1837, aged 90, and Thomas, who emigrated to India, where he worked in the revenue office at Fort William. They also had a daughter, Sarah.

== Works ==
- His own house at the Great Hospital, Norwich (1752), now known as St Helen's House.
- Norwich Theatre (1757). Destroyed.
- Methodist meeting-house in Bishopsgate Street, Norwich (1752–3), later known as the "Tabernacle". Demolished 1953.
- Assembly House, Norwich (1754). There is evidence that the interiors of the Assembly House were by the Cambridge academic James Burrough.
- Octagon Chapel, Colegate, Norwich (1754–6).
- Houses at 29-35 Surrey Street (1761-2) and 25-27 Surrey Street (c1771). The later pair of houses have been demolished.
- Artillery barracks, Norwich (1771). Now known as Ivory House .
- Additions to Blickling Hall, Norfolk (1767–79).
- St Catherine's House, All Saints Green, Norwich, possibly completed by his son, William Ivory.

== Sources ==
- Maddison, John (2004). "Ivory, Thomas (1709–1779)". Oxford Dictionary of National Biography (online ed.). Oxford University Press. doi:10.1093/ref:odnb/14508. (Subscription, Wikipedia Library access or UK public library membership required.)
- Pevsner, Nikolaus (1962). Norwich and North-East Norfolk. The Buildings of England. Harmondsworth: Penguin.

Attribution

This article incorporates text from a publication now in the public domain: Porter, Bertha (1892). "Ivory, Thomas (1709-1779)". In Lee, Sidney (ed.). Dictionary of National Biography. Vol. 29. London: Smith, Elder & Co. pp. 83–84.
