= Benjamin Plim Bellamy =

English actor

Benjamin Plim Bellamy (1782–1847) was an English actor.

== Early life ==
He was baptised at St. Mary Magdalene, Bridgnorth, Shropshire on 27 September 1782, son of William and Ann Bellamy. He married Elizabeth Walker at Scarborough, North Yorkshire on 12 October 1806.

== Acting career ==
For some 30 years was a favourite actor on the Norwich Theatre Circuit.

== Controversy in Ipswich ==
In 1810 the Suffolk Chronicle hired a corrosive new critic, up to which time the Norwich Company had been used to receiving a favourable press. For the summer season 1810 the 'Ipswich Theatre' was showing She Stoops to Conquer and the Chronicle reported 'The performance possessed all the worst defects of a provincial exhibition' and actor Frederick Vining was rapped for his 'schoolboy recitation' with the managers accused of having dredged up a miserable orchestra. Worse followed when the Chronicle sent the reporter to every following show and the reviews became more critical. After an uneasy truce Bellamy, who was playing Polonius in Hamlet in 1813, when the Chronicle reported 'We never saw a viler Polonius than Bellamy's' to which he replied with a pamphlet A Plain Letter to the Dramatic Censor of The Suffolk Chronicle (Ipswich 1814). By this time relations between the company and the newspaper had further deteriorated. The critic was identified as Thomas Harral and after an uproar at the play The Maid of the Mill, Harral, on leaving the theatre, was attacked in Tankard [Tacket] Street, Ipswich by Vining and his friends, when his coat was ripped from his back and he narrowly escaped a ducking. His critical spleen unsettled some of the actors and in May 1815 Vining left for Covent Garden and Bellamy followed shortly afterwards but returned as manager of the Norwich circuit three years later.

== Later activity ==
In 1819 Bellamy took over the editorship of the Bury Herald but in 1823 he resumed his original career at Bath where in 1827 he became manager of the Theatre but he resigned soon afterwards on becoming lessee of the Bath Assembly Rooms. He lived on Beacon Hill, Walcot. He died at Bath on 30 September 1847, aged 65. He is buried in Bath Abbey Cemetery, where the monument to him has Grade II listed status. The epitaph describes him as "Distinguished for tenderness of heart variety of talents extensive attainments and perfect probity as a companion he was generally welcome while his firmness of character rendered him inestimable as a friend".
