= Norwich Theatre Circuit =

Theatrical venues in East Anglia

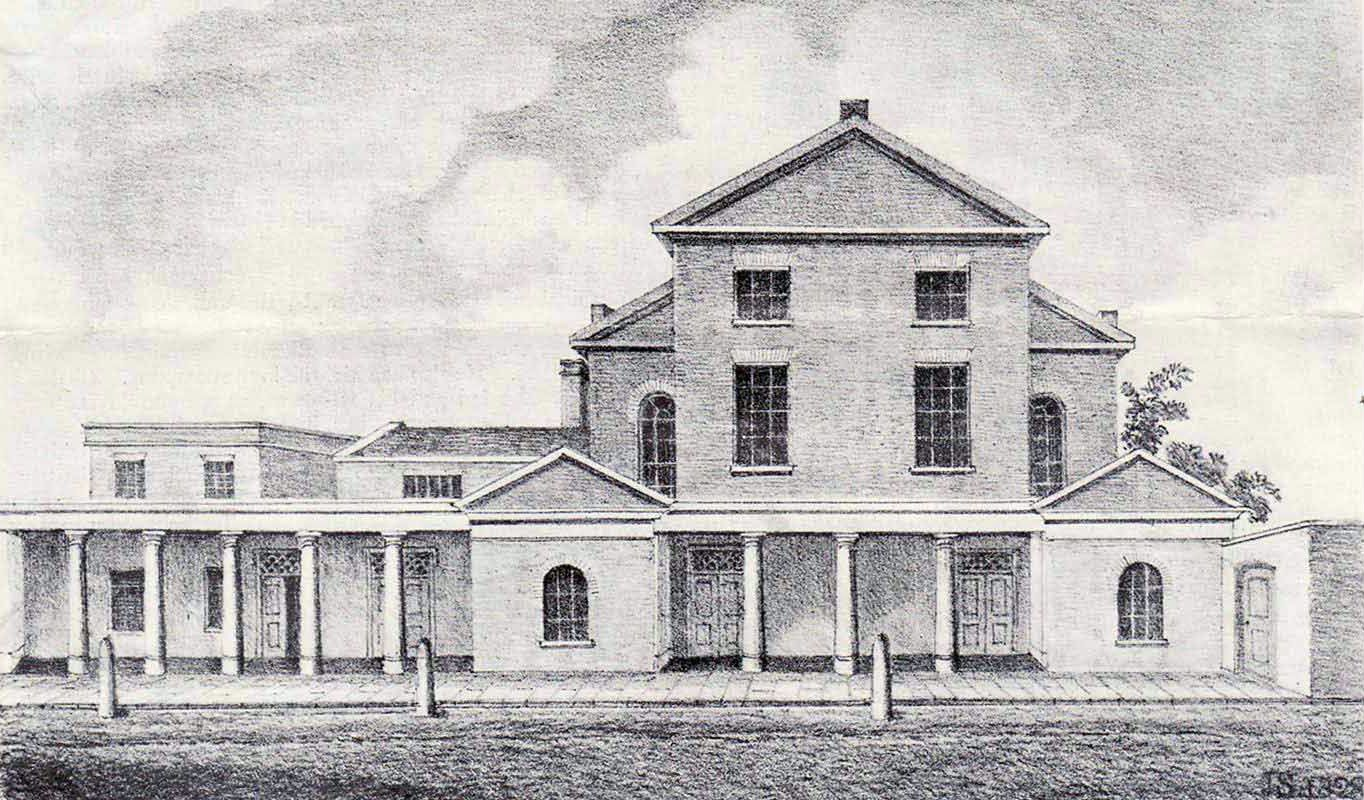
The Theatre Royal, Norwich, in 1828.

The Norwich Theatre Circuit was a prominent network of theatrical venues in East Anglia established in the eighteenth century. It remained one of the foremost institutions of provincial theatre in England until the mid nineteenth century.

Aside from Norwich, the circuit also included King's Lynn, Great Yarmouth, Cambridge, Bury St Edmunds, Ipswich and Colchester.

The Norwich Company of Comedians was for many years the principal troupe to use the circuit. They carried their costumes, scenery and musical instruments from venue to venue. At each location they would spend six to eight weeks generally timed to coincide with a special event in the town.

From 1786 for an initial 7 year contract the circuit was leased by John Brunton until, in 1799, William Wilkins – who had been an investor since 1768 – took over running the business.

In 1815,the theatres were inherited by Wilkins' son, also called William Wilkins (1778–1839), a leading architect. He continued to manage them for the rest of his life, and rebuilt or remodelled several of them, occasionally also designing scenery.
