= Suffolk Chronicle =

The Suffolk Chronicle, was a weekly newspaper published in Ipswich by J. King from 5 May 1810 until 28 December, 1872.

The Chronicle was a radical newspaper with the motto "Open to all parties, influenced by none". It was a rival to the Tory paper, the Ipswich Journal.
