= W. Gibbs Bartleet =

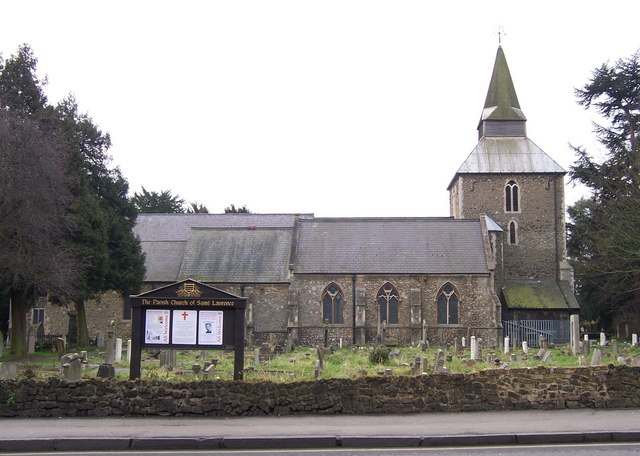
- The Church of St Laurence, Upminster, largely rebuilt by Bartleet.
- Born: 1829; Handsworth, Birmingham, England
- Died: 10 March 1905 (aged 75–76)
- Known for: Architect

W. Gibbs Bartleet (1829 – 10 March 1906) was an English Victorian architect.

== Life ==
Bartleet was born in Handsworth, Birmingham. He moved to Brentwood, Essex in the early 1860s and later to Beckenham. During his career, he was based in the Old Broad Street in the City of London, and in Brentwood.

He was honorary surveyor of the German Hospital at Dalston, where he is mentioned as having carried out extensive repairs by 1857.

In 1870, he added a chancel and south transept to Alexander Dick Gough's St. Saviour's Church, Herne Hill (built 1856, demolished 1981). At Upminster he largely rebuilt the medieval church of St. Laurence in 1863, and in 1872-3 remodelled Hill Place for Temple Soanes in a restrained Gothic style, of diapered red brick with stone facings. He also enlarged or rebuilt the churches of St Mary, Dunton, Essex, St. Mary the Virgin, Shenfield and St. Michael and All Angels, in Wilmington, Kent.

In London, he built offices for the Promoter Life Assurance Company in a neo-Renaissance style in Fleet Street, and in 1873 refronted a pair of eighteenth-century terraced houses in Henrietta Street, Covent Garden in an Italianate style for the London and County Bank. He designed several other branches for the bank, including one at Guildford (1886). At Chigwell, Essex, he designed Woodlands (later renamed Woodview) as a large country house for the brewing magnate, Philip Savill, in 1881.

Between 1885 and 1887, he carried out a grandiose rebuilding of St. George's Church, Beckenham (1885-1887), formerly a "humble medieval village church." The tower, however, was not completed until 1902-3.

His son, Sydney Francis Bartleet, (fl. 1879-1927), also an architect, was taken into the partnership in 1891.
