= Charlotte Canda =

American debutante (1828–1845)

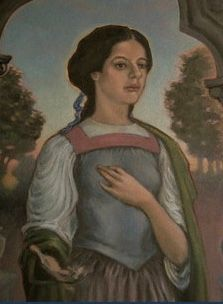
- Born: February 3, 1828
- Died: February 3, 1845 (aged 17); New York City, U.S.
- Cause of death: Accidental fall from moving horse carriage
- Resting place: Green-Wood Cemetery; 40.655295°N 73.991910°W
- Monuments: Victorian mausoleum
- Known for: Heiress debutante with ornate burial monument
- Parents: Charles Canda (father) (1792–1866); Adele Canda (mother) (1804–1871)
- Relatives: Clemence Canda (aunt) (1816–1844)

Charlotte Canda (February 3, 1828 – February 3, 1845), sometimes referred to simply as "Miss Canda", was a young debutante who died in a horse carriage accident on the way home from her seventeenth birthday party in New York City. She is memorialized by a Victorian mausoleum in Green-Wood Cemetery by Robert Launitz and John Frazee. The ornately and expensively decorated monument attracted thousands of visitors to Green-Wood Cemetery in the late 19th century.

== Background ==
Charlotte's father, Charles Canda, was an officer in Napoleon's army and the headmaster of a school on Lafayette Place in Manhattan. He and his wife, Adele Canda, adopted Charlotte when she was an infant. Charles Canda was dropping one of Charlotte's friends off at a home on Waverly Place in Manhattan on her 17th birthday when the horses became spooked, perhaps because of a storm, and bolted. Charlotte fell out of the moving carriage at Broadway and Waverly Place, hitting her head on the pavement. She died in her father's arms.

== Burial ==
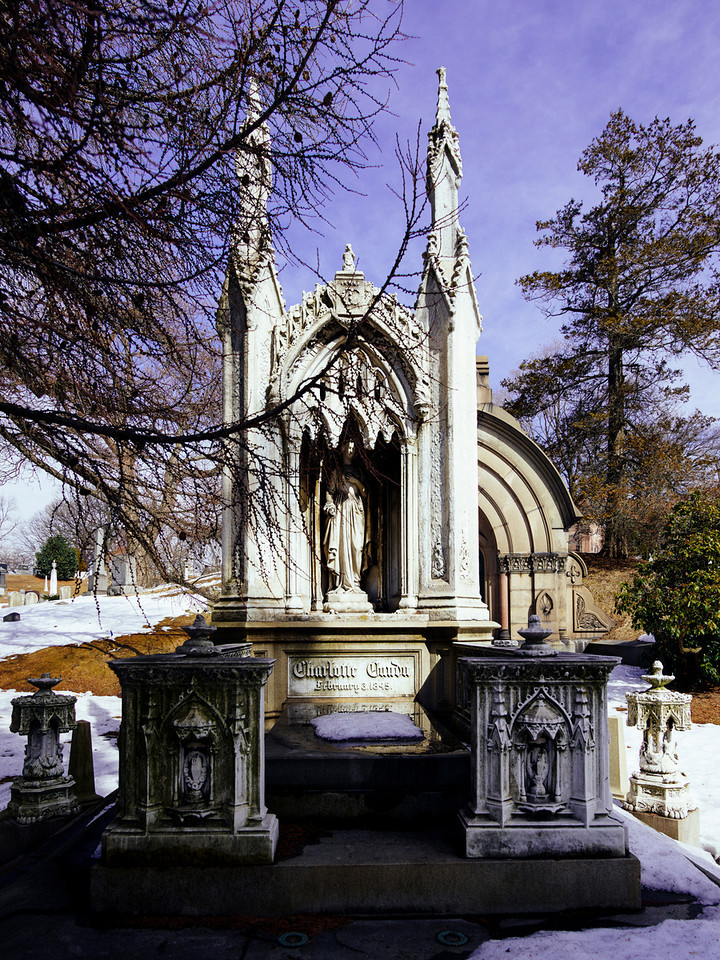
Burial monument of Charlotte Canda

Canda, as a Catholic, was first interred at the Old Saint Patrick's Cathedral at Prince Street and Mott Street. Her monumental mausoleum, completed in 1847, is located at Greenbough Avenue and Fern Avenue within Green-Wood Cemetery in Brooklyn. She was interred in consecrated ground at the cemetery on April 29, 1848.

The monument is constructed of white Carrara marble in the style of a tabernacle and features Gothic Revival architecture stylings such as spires, carved flowers, and angels. A large statue of Canda in her birthday gown is displayed beneath a marble canopy. In an 1893 article, The New World remarked on her "fair form still preserved in Marble." Sculptor Launitz did the tomb design work along with Frazee, although Frazee's role has been called into question by some of his biographers. The design was based in part on Canda's own sketches for a memorial to her aunt, Clemence Canda, who had died the year before.

Symbolism at the monument includes books (Charlotte was fluent in five languages); musical instruments; drawing tools; down-turned torches, signifying extinguished life (except life that burns in the hereafter); parrots (her pets); and seventeen roses (she was celebrating her seventeenth birthday). The monument is also seventeen feet high and seventeen feet long.

The mausoleum cost more than $45,000 (equivalent to $1,538,988.16 in 2020) and was once a popular monument for visitors in Green-Wood Cemetery, attracting crowds. In the late 19th century, New Yorkers used to picnic at the cemetery. The expense and spectacle of the memorial, together with the romantic tragedy of the young heiress's death, attracted such a degree of public attention that for some decades after her death, references in popular press simply to "Miss Canda" could be understood to refer to Charlotte.

Charles Albert Jarrett de la Marie (1819–1847), said to be Canda's fiancé, committed suicide a year after her death and is buried nearby. As a suicide, he could not be buried on consecrated ground with his bride-to-be and was instead buried in unconsecrated ground nearby under a small upright tombstone with his family's coat of arms.

== Tributes ==
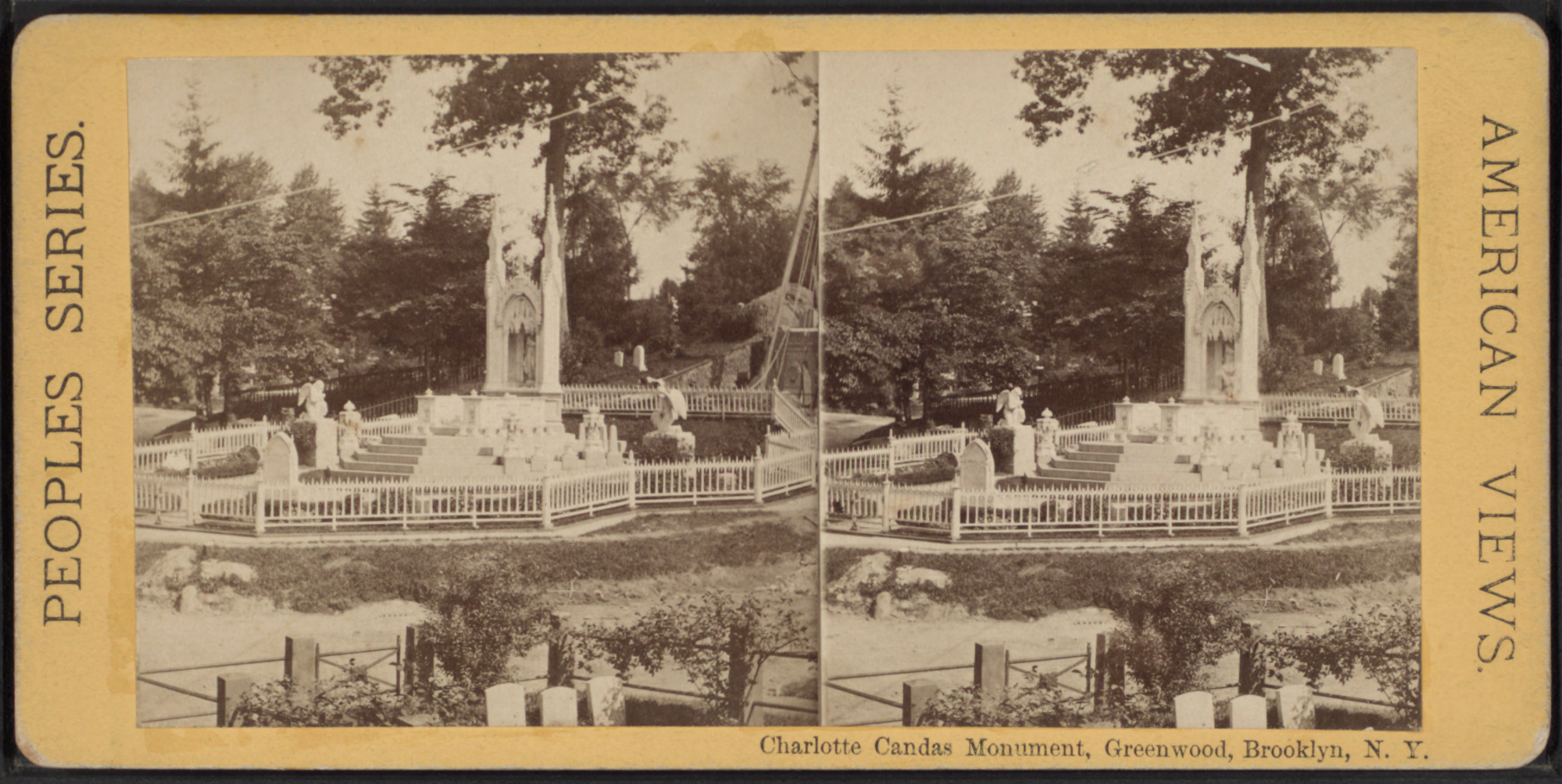
Stereoscopy of burial monument from Robert N. Dennis collection

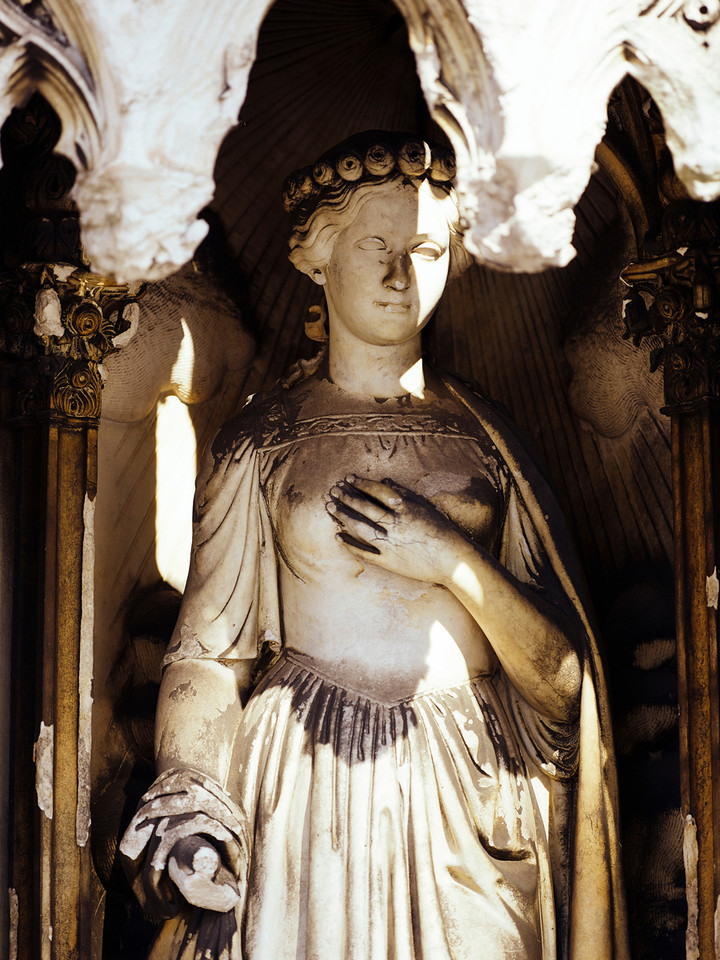
Detail of marble statue in burial monument of Charlotte Canda

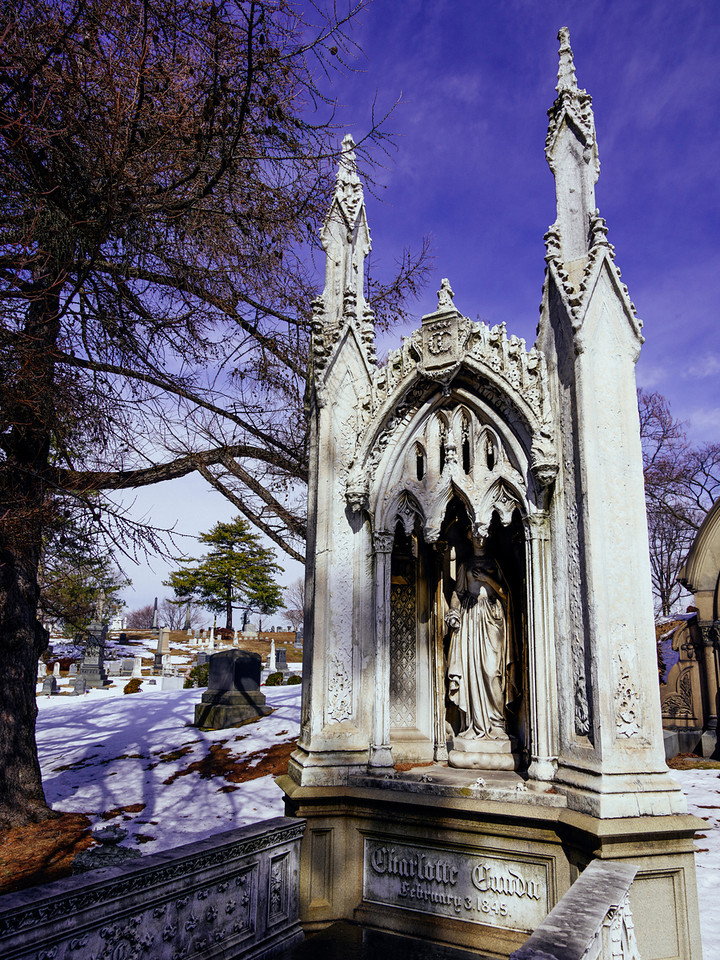
Angle view of burial monument

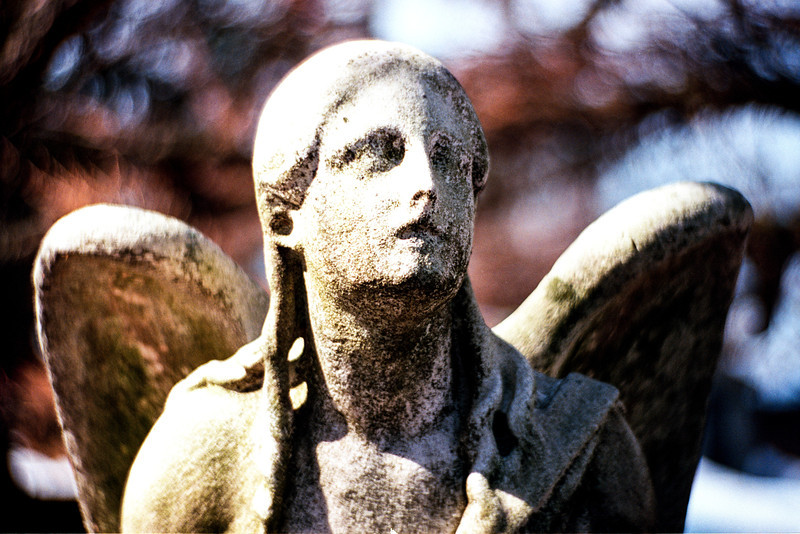
A pair of angels flank the monument

Andrea Janes (A. J. Sweeney) wrote a story in tribute to Charlotte Canda.

In 1897, Daniel Pelton published a collection of poems entitled Greenwood, An Elegy: Meditations Among the Tombs, in which he included an ode to Charlotte Canda:

"Charlotte Canda"
Turn'd to the left, I seek the intricate round,
Where Charlotte Canda decorates the ground,
Like Sirius, fairest of the starry line.
Yet death seems setting on that heavenly shrine;
All tombs around are in its splendor lost,
And all must bow before its mighty cost.
Yet who would envy, who would take her place,
Though not possessed of any wealth or grace.
The dread of pain, tenacity of life,
Increase with woe, and feed on mortal strife;

In vain the roses round her bloom,
Vain may the polished marble shine,
In vain the sculptured image show
Charlotte in life almost divine.
Still all is night beneath the gorgeous tomb,
And the black grave wears the same dismal gloom.

Thou lovely flower, too delicate for earth,
'Tis only strange such beauty here had birth;
Supine it fell before the autumnal blast
To rise to Heaven when wintry storms have passed.

== Image gallery ==
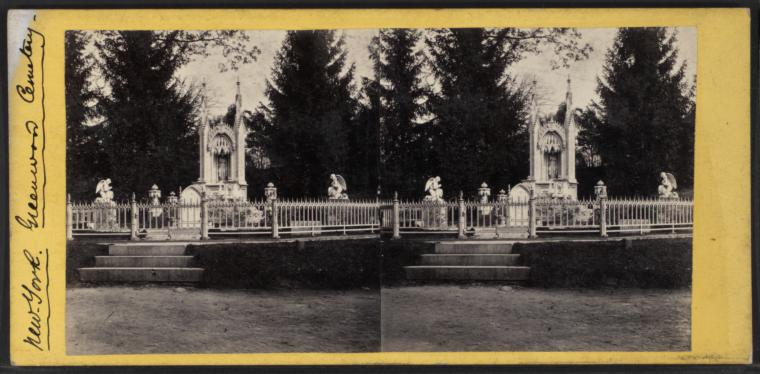
Stereoscopic view of burial monument by E. & H. T. Anthony

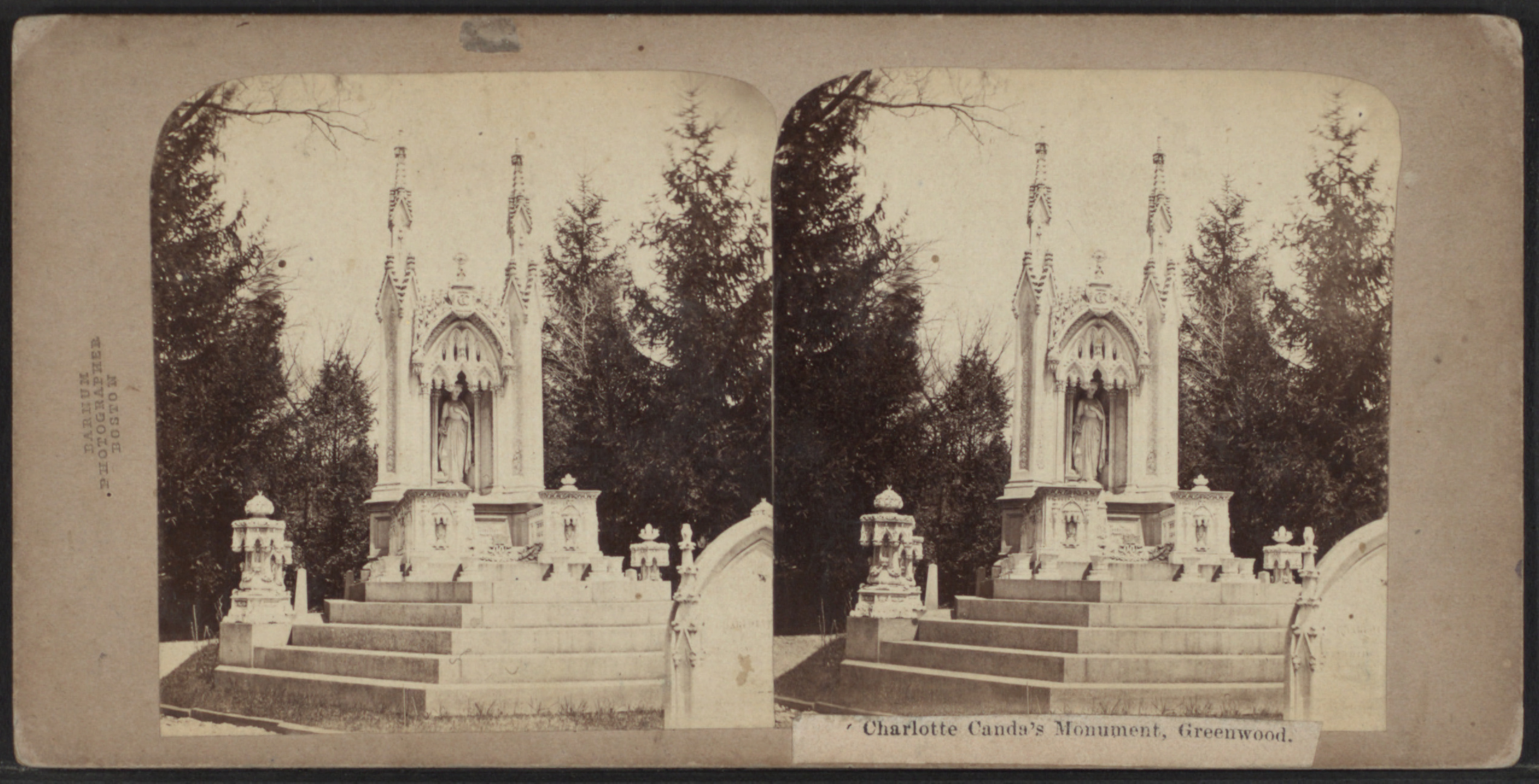
Stereoscopic view by Deloss Barnum
See more media related to Charlotte Canda on Commons
