= John Wilson Walton-Wilson =

English architect (1823–1910)

John Wilson Walton-Wilson F.R.I.B.A., J.P.
- Born: John Wilson Walton; 10 July 1823; Camberwell, London, England
- Died: 14 April 1910 (aged 86); Shotley Hall, Northumberland, England
- Occupation: Architect
- Buildings: St Augustine's Church, Alston
- Projects: Renovation, St Mary's Church, Nun Monkton

John Wilson Walton-Wilson (10 July 1823 – 14 April 1910), born John Wilson Walton, was an English architect who designed Anglican churches in the Early English style. His change of name was a condition by which he inherited Shotley Hall and the Wilson family coat of arms from his uncle Thomas Wilson. He is known for his design of St Augustine's Church, Alston, Cumbria, and for his collaboration with the sculptor Robert Beall in his renovation of St Mary's Church, Nun Monkton North Riding of Yorkshire.

== Background ==
Walton-Wilson's maternal grandfather was John Wilson, gentleman, of Shotley Hall, Northumberland. John Wilson's son-in-law was Thomas Walton who married John Wilson's daughter Maria. Walton-Wilson, son of Thomas Walton, a "gentleman", and Maria Walton, was born as John Wilson Walton on 10 July 1823 at Albany House, Camberwell, (Note: The birth date of J. W. Walton-Wilson is inscribed on his gravestone. Re his father: in this context, in the 19th century, "gentleman" was the term used for a man of independent means. Thus used, the term did not refer to morality or behaviour.) He was baptised on 6 August 1823 at St Giles' Church, Camberwell.

=== Shotley Hall, change of name, and inheritance ===
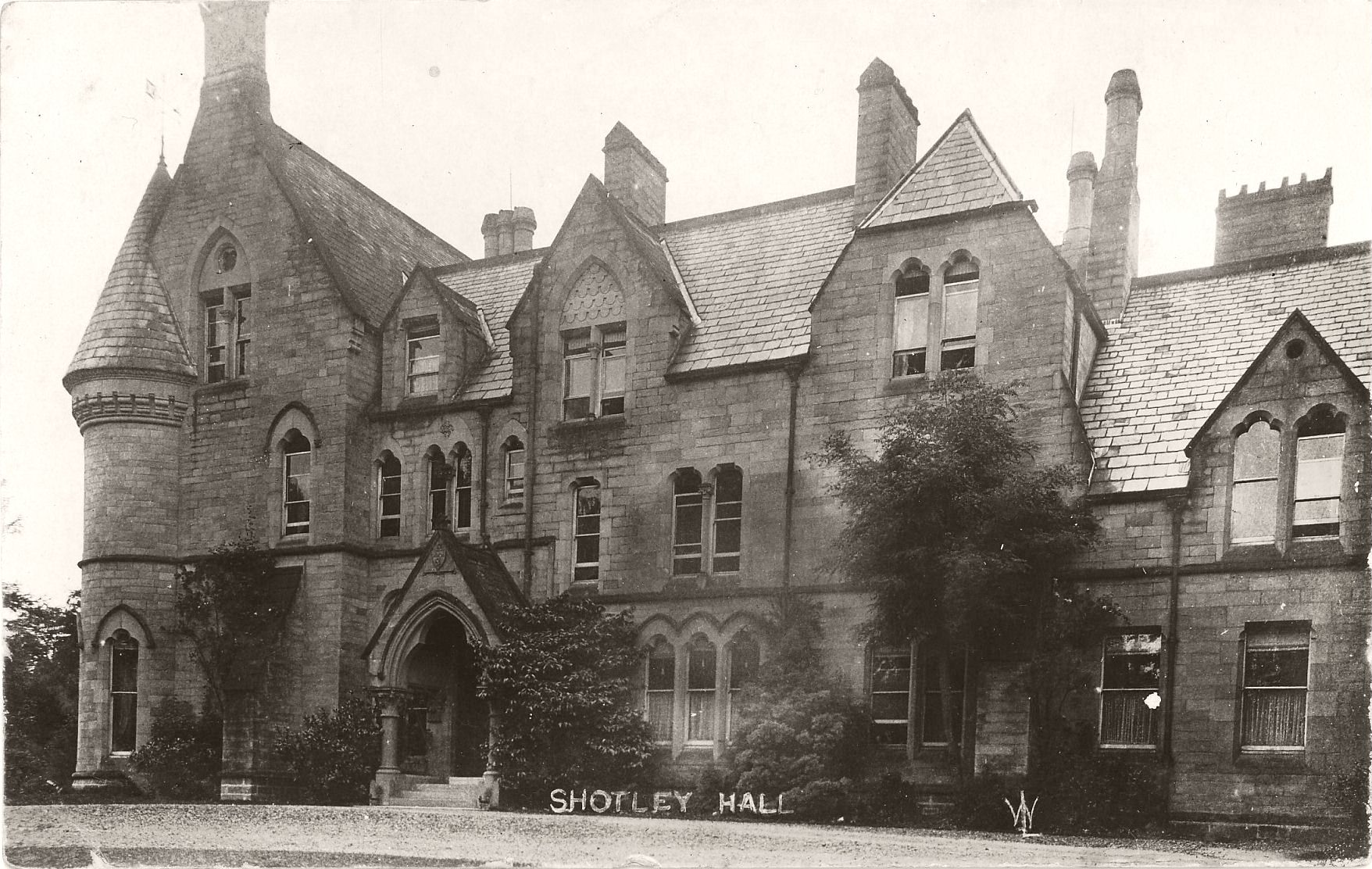
Shotley Hall

Old Shotley Hall was purchased in 1818 by Walton-Wilson's maternal uncle Thomas Wilson. (Note: Thomas Wilson was the son of John Wilson, brother of Maria Walton nee Wilson, and uncle of John Wilson Walton-Wilson. Old Shotley Hall became known as Derwent Dene, and was later demolished.) Thomas Wilson had a new Gothic Revival Shotley Hall built to the design of Edward Robert Robson, and it was completed in 1863. Thomas Wilson, a lead mine owner, died without issue. He left the new Shotley Hall to his nephew John Wilson Walton, on condition that he assumed the additional surname of Wilson, and the Wilson family coat of arms. This change of name was gazetted on 22 October 1880. Walton-Wilson's descendants continued to own Shotley Hall, finally selling it in 2016.

=== Marriage ===
Walton-Wilson married Lucy Short, at St Saviour's Church, South Hampstead (in London), on 26 January 1865. (Note: Lucy Short (c.1840–1901), youngest daughter of William Charles Short. GRO index: Marriages Mar 1865 Short Lucy. Walton, John Wilson, Hampstead 1a 893. Deaths Dec 1901 Wilson Lucy Walton 61 Hexham 10b 245.) One of their sons was Lieut. Hugh Wilson Walton-Wilson, who inherited Shotley Hall and married one of the daughters of the fourth Craufurd baronet of Kilbirney. (Note: Hugh Wilson Walton-Wilson (1869–1921). GRO index: Births Jun 1869 Walton Hugh Wilson Wandsworth 1d 508. Deaths Mar 1921 Walton-Wilson Hugh 51 Hexham 10b 524) J.W. Walton-Wilson's eldest daughter was Katherine Mary Beatrice Walton, who married Reverend Robert O'Donelan, Canon of Newcastle Cathedral, in 1897. (Note: Katherine Mary Beatrice Walton (1866–1927). GRO index: Births Mar 1866 Walton Katharine M. B. Wandsworth 1d 534. Marriages Sep 1930 Ross-Lewin Francis H. W. Crawhall and Walton Katharine M.B., Farnham 2a 449.)

Walton-Wilson lived in London between 1853 and 1860, in Durham in 1859, in London between 1870 and 1882, and at Shotley Hall, in 1910.

=== Death ===
Walton-Wilson died aged 86 on 14 April 1910 at Shotley Hall, Northumberland. (Note: Walton-Wilson's death certificate gives his surname as Wilson. GRO index: Deaths Jun 1910 Wilson John Wilson W 86 Hexham 10b 195.) He left £66,365 (equivalent to £6,758,745 in 2025). The Walton-Wilson family are memorialised inside St John's Church, Shotley Low Quarter, Northumberland. He is buried in St John's Churchyard, Shotley Low Quarter.

== Career ==
Walton-Wilson was known professionally as J.W. Walton until October 1880. Thenceforth he worked under the name of J.W. Walton-Wilson. Between 1845 and 1847, Walton-Wilson was articled to Henry Roberts. During the same period, he studied at the Royal Academy Schools, attaining a silver medal. Between 1847 and 1849, he acted as Sir Charles Barry's assistant. Between 1849 and 1852, he travelled in Asia Minor, Africa and Europe. From 1853, Walton-Wilson practised in London, and in Durham from 1859. He was in partnership with Edward Robert Robson for a period of at least two years, between 1858 or 1860, and 20 August 1862. In 1892, Walton-Wilson retired as an architect.

== Works ==
=== St Cuthbert's Church, Durham (Anglican), 1858–1863 ===
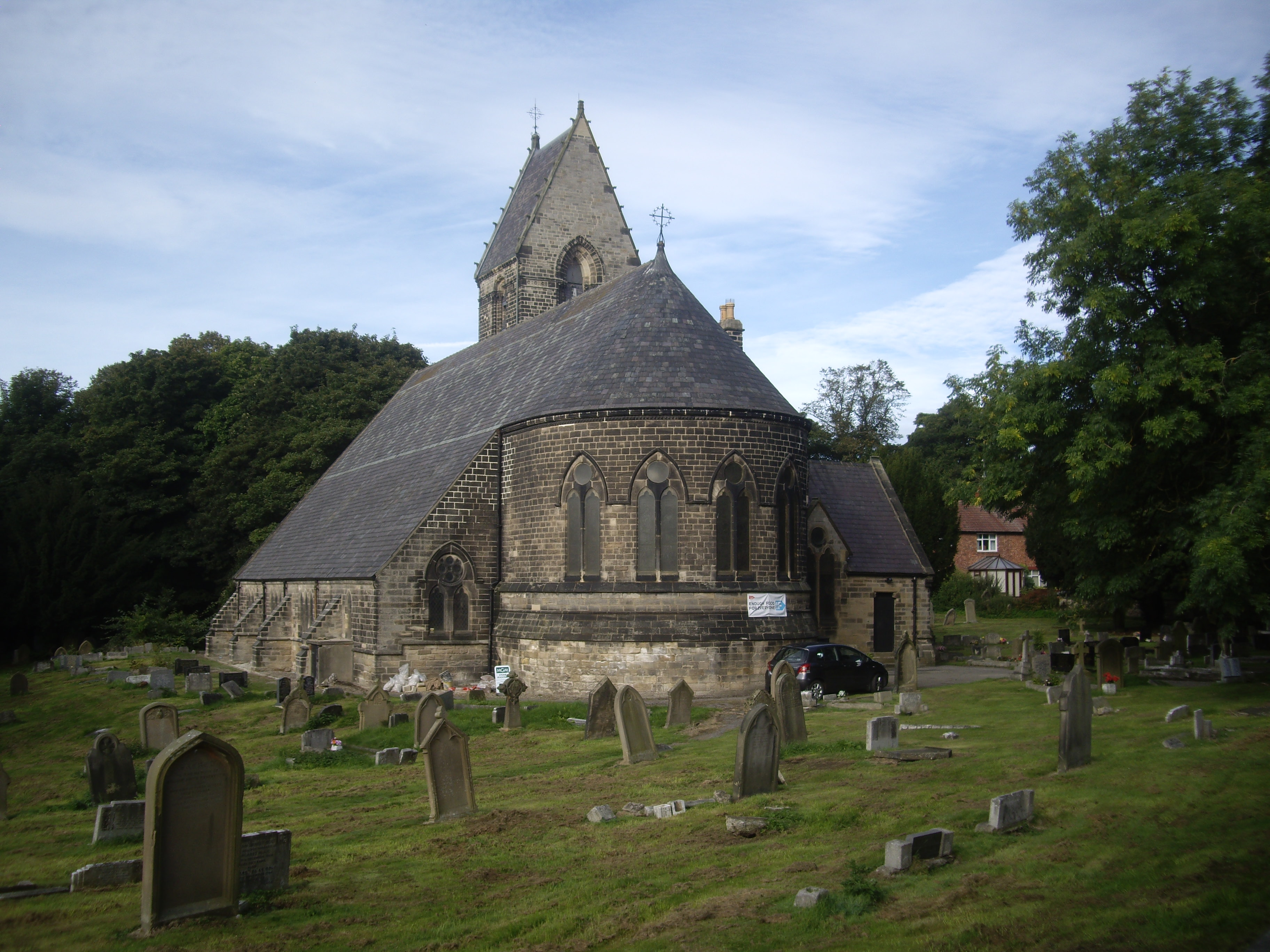
St Cuthbert's, Durham

This is a Gothic Revival, Grade II listed building. Architectural partners John Wilson Walton-Wilson and Edward Robert Robson designed this church, and were calling for builders to erect it in September 1861, although the design was credited by Historic England to Robson only. It was built in "Early English style with French influence". It was consecrated on 27 August 1863, by the Bishop of Durham.

The exterior of the church is notable for its sandstone-block walls, the diapering on the roof formed of light and dark slate, the large wheel window with a central Cross of St Cuthbert on the west front, the large apse with conical roof at the east end, and the tower with its statue of St Cuthbert holding the head of King Oswold and its tympanum featuring Christ in Majesty. Inside, it has a "waggon roof with king-post trusses", and columns of Frosterley marble (or pink granite) in the arcade.

=== St Augustine's Church, Alston, 1870 ===
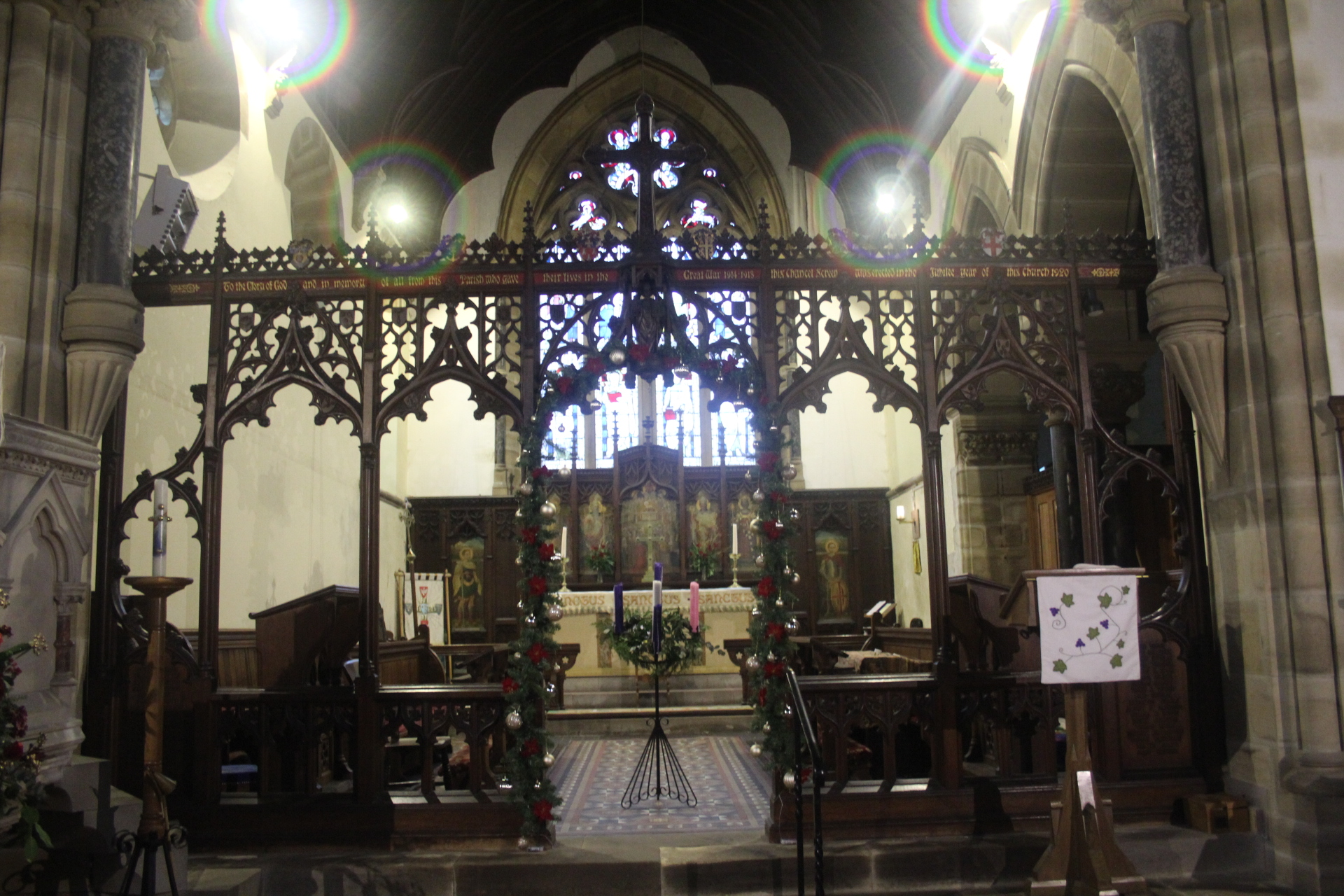
Chancel of St Augustine's, Alston

This is a Grade II listed building in Alston, Cumbria. It was built on the site of the previous 1770 church by John Smeaton. However, when levelling the site for the new build, workmen found evidence of a 12th- or 13th-century medieval church which had painted walls. The foundation stone of the new church was laid by Walton-Wilson's wife on 18 August 1869.

St Augustin's Church was built in the Early English style: ashlar with buttresses and traceried lancet windows. The arcade in the nave has polished granite shafts, and capitals carved with leaves. In the chancel is a painted reredos, and in the nave, the bowl of the font has a central stem with marble columns around it. The nave and chancel were designed by Walton-Wilson, and a spire was added by architect George Dale Oliver in 1886. (Note: Architect George Dale Oliver (1851–1928) of Carlisle. For further details of G.D. Oliver, see Brodie (2001), p.286.)

=== Renovation, St Mary's Church, Nun Monkton, 1869–1873 ===
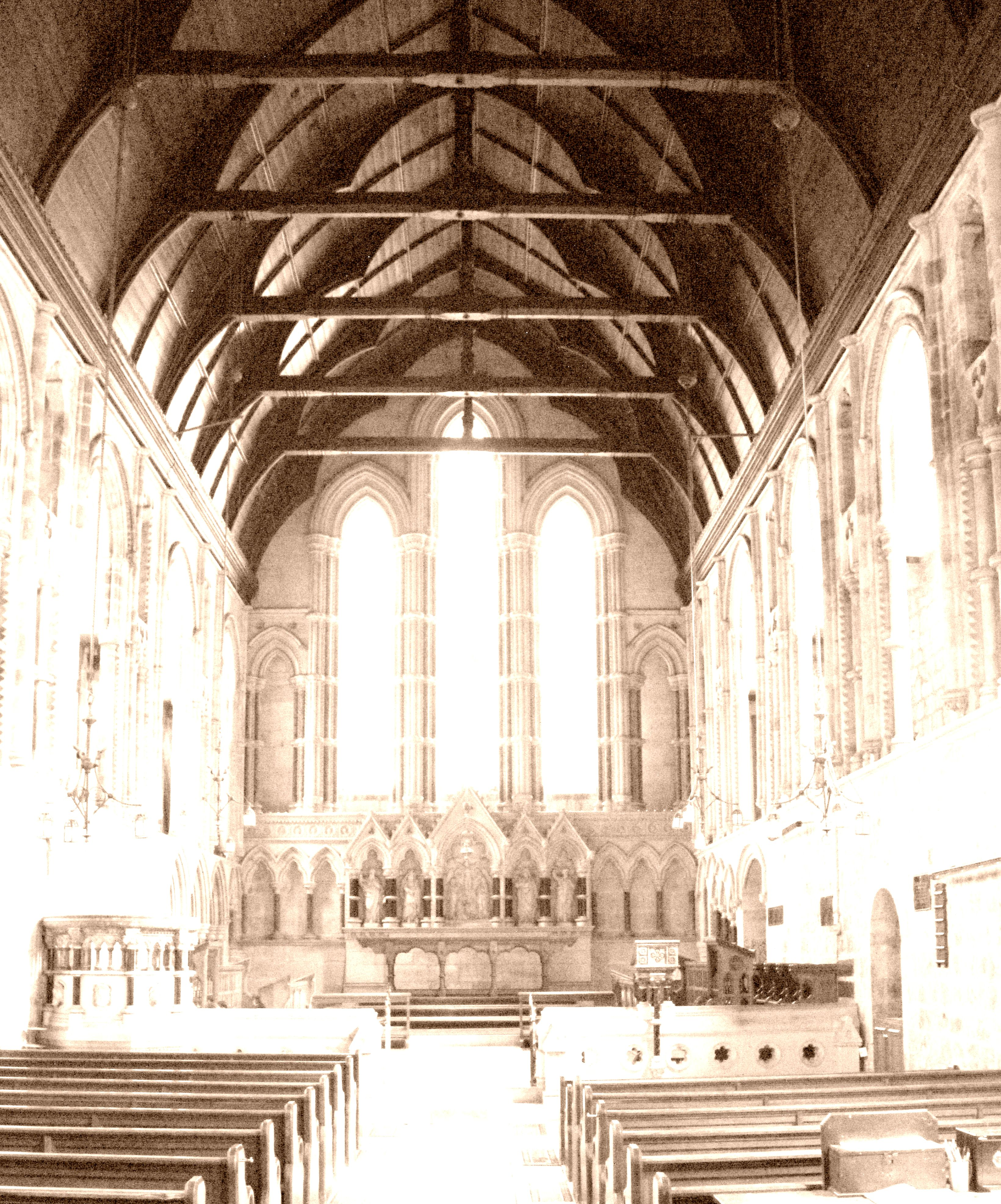
Chancel, St Mary's, Nun Monkton

This is a Grade I listed building, founded in the 12th or 13th century. Costing £4,400 (equivalent to £413,635 in 2025), It was restored to designs by architect John Wilson Walton, (Note: Architect John Wilson Walton of 12 Buckingham Street, London WC (Post Office London Directory 1870) and Shotley Hall, Northumberland. This is John Wilson Walton-Wilson (1823–1910). See "Walton-Wilson, John Wilson", in Brodie, Antonia (2001) Directory of British Architects, 1834-1914 Vol. 2 (L-Z), ISBN 9780826455147, Bloomsbury Academic, page 909.) and re-opened and consecrated by the Bishop of Ripon, on 16 October 1873, after three hundred years of neglect. Walton-Wilson added a chancel, a vestry and an organ chamber. The restoration cost over £4,000 (equivalent to £376,032 in 2025). The reredos and pulpit were executed by Robert Beall.

=== Extension, St Cuthbert's Church, Shotley Bridge, Consett, 1881–1886 ===
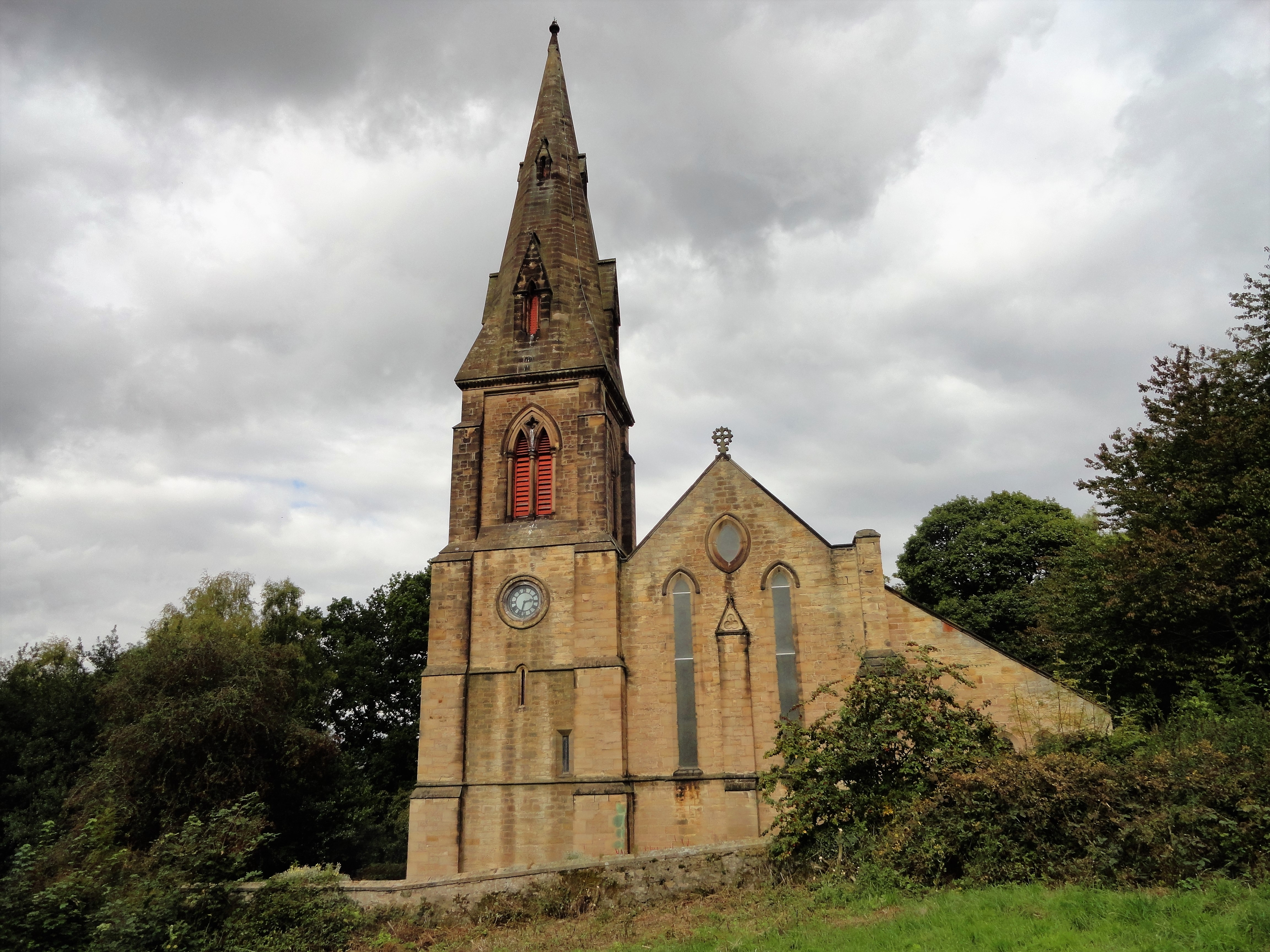
St Cuthbert's Church, Consett

This church is a Gothic Revival, Grade II listed building in Church Bank, Shotley Bridge, Consett, County Durham, completed in 1850 to designs by John Dobson. It was funded by public subscription and by Walton-Wilson's uncle Thomas Wilson of Shotley Hall. Between 1881 and 1886 Walton-Wilson added the vestry, choir and organ, and the south aisle which has stained glass windows by Percy Bacon Brothers. (Note: For more images of St Cuthbert's Church, see Category St Cuthbert's Church, Consett)

== Institutions and civic service ==
Walton-Wilson became an Associate of the Royal Institute of British Architects (ARIBA) on 23 April 1860, following the proposals of Thomas Leverton Donaldson, Henry Roberts (to whom he was previously articled) and Charles Barry. On 20 March 1882 he became a Fellow of the RIBA, having been proposed by George Somers Leigh Clarke, Octavius Hansard, (Note: Octavius Hansard (c.1826–1897) was a British architect who flourished c.1850. See "Octavius Hansard", British Museum GRO index:Deaths Dec 1897 Hansard Octavius 71 Marylebone 1a 397) and his business partner Edward Robert Robson.

Walton-Wilson was a justice of the peace, and became one of the oldest magistrates of the West Division of Chester Ward. "The magistrates had always found his advice sound and practical; and as experienced in architecture, his counsel in all matters pertaining to buildings and cognate subjects was very valuable". He was chairman of the North West Durham Conservative Association. He was a member of the Cambridge, Camden and Ecclesiological Society from 24 April 1852, until at least 1864.

== Competitions ==
In 1855 Walton-Wilson competed in Newcastle for an award of £50 (equivalent to £4,655.63 in 2025) for "the best design for the new street from St Nicholas's Square to the High Level Bridge". The plans were exhibited at the Merchant Venturers' Court at the Guildhall in Newcastle on 10 December 1855. In the event, the competition was won by John Johnstone.
