= Shotley Hall =

Historic mansion in Northumberland, England

Coordinates: 54°52′08″N 1°51′51″W

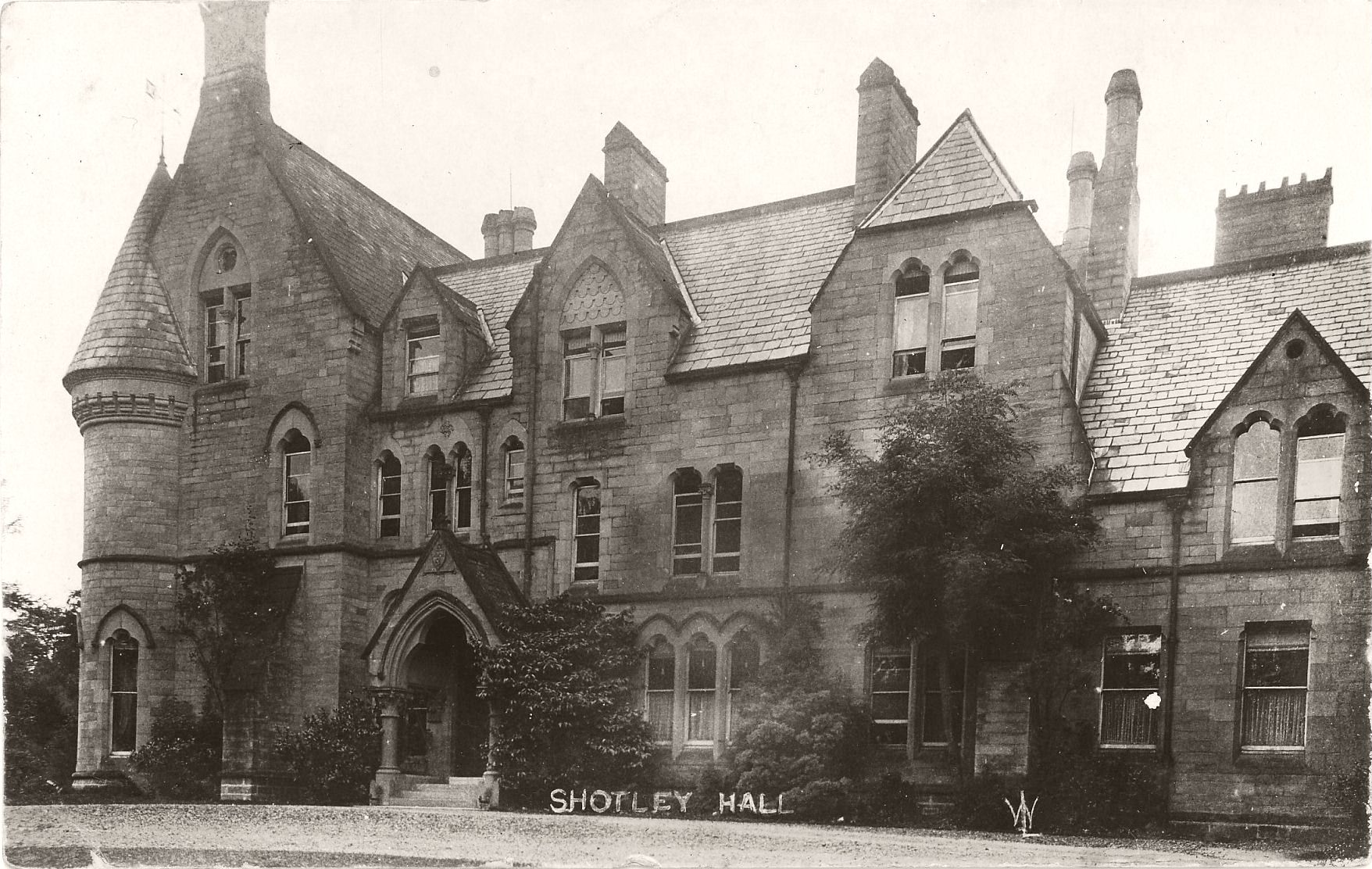

Shotley Hall is a Grade II* listed historic mansion in Shotley Low Quarter, Northumberland, England. It was designed in the Gothic Revival architectural style by Edward Robert Robson, and its construction was completed in 1863.

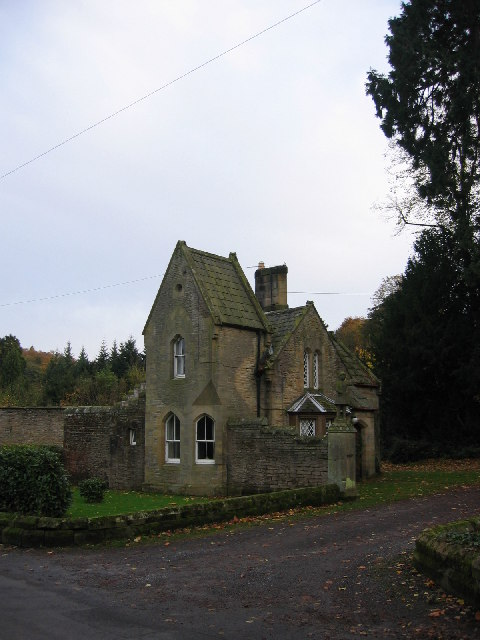
Shotley Hall Gatehouse. View of the old gatehouse to shotley hall, now private dwellings.

== History ==
The nearby places of High and Low Waskerley were listed as part of the lands of Hugh de Bolbec on his death in 1262 (not to be confused with the Wakserley over the border in Country Durham). By 1313 the land was held by Walter de Huntercombe on his death and then passed into the king's hands while the lands were disputed between John De Lancsater and Ralph fitz William. In 1549 the chapel of Shotley and associated lands, including Waskerley, were granted to Sir Thomas Gargrave, of North Emsall, Yorkshire, and to William Adamson.

The 1663 Book of Rates for Shotley listed the owner as Thomas Mills (listed under "Warscally or Waskerley").

During most of the 18th century the Andrews family of Shotley Hall owned the area eventually selling to the banker Arthur Mowbray of Durham in 1800 who sold off the lands in 1815. For the remainder of the century and until 1916 it belonged to the same owner as Shotley Hall, namely the Wilson and Walton-Wilson family, which included the architect John Wilson Walton-Wilson.
