= Robert Beall (sculptor) =

19th-century British sculptor (c. 1836–1892)

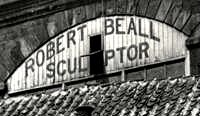
- Beall's workshop sign on High Level Bridge Approach
- Born: c. 1836; Stamford, Lincolnshire
- Died: 9 January 1892, aged 55; Newcastle upon Tyne, England
- Resting place: Elswick Cemetery,
- Known for: Sculpture of memorials
- Children: Robert Eusebius Beall, who sculpted Cædmon's Cross at Whitby (1898)

Robert Beall (c. 1836 – 8 January 1892) was an English sculptor, marble merchant and monumental mason, with a stoneyard and workshop in Newcastle upon Tyne, Tyne and Wear. He executed decorative fonts, reredoses and a baptistry screen in various churches, besides monuments and memorials for graveyards, and for three Grade I listed church interiors.

Beall established his workshop in 1861 adjacent to High Level Bridge in Newcastle. Within ten years he was employing fifty-four men, sixteen boys and four women. His company became a business legacy. Beall apprenticed his son Robert Eusebius Beall, who took over the company after his death. Thereafter, the company continued under the name of Robert Beall until the 1930s. Beall's was known for erecting war memorials in the 1920s.

== Background ==
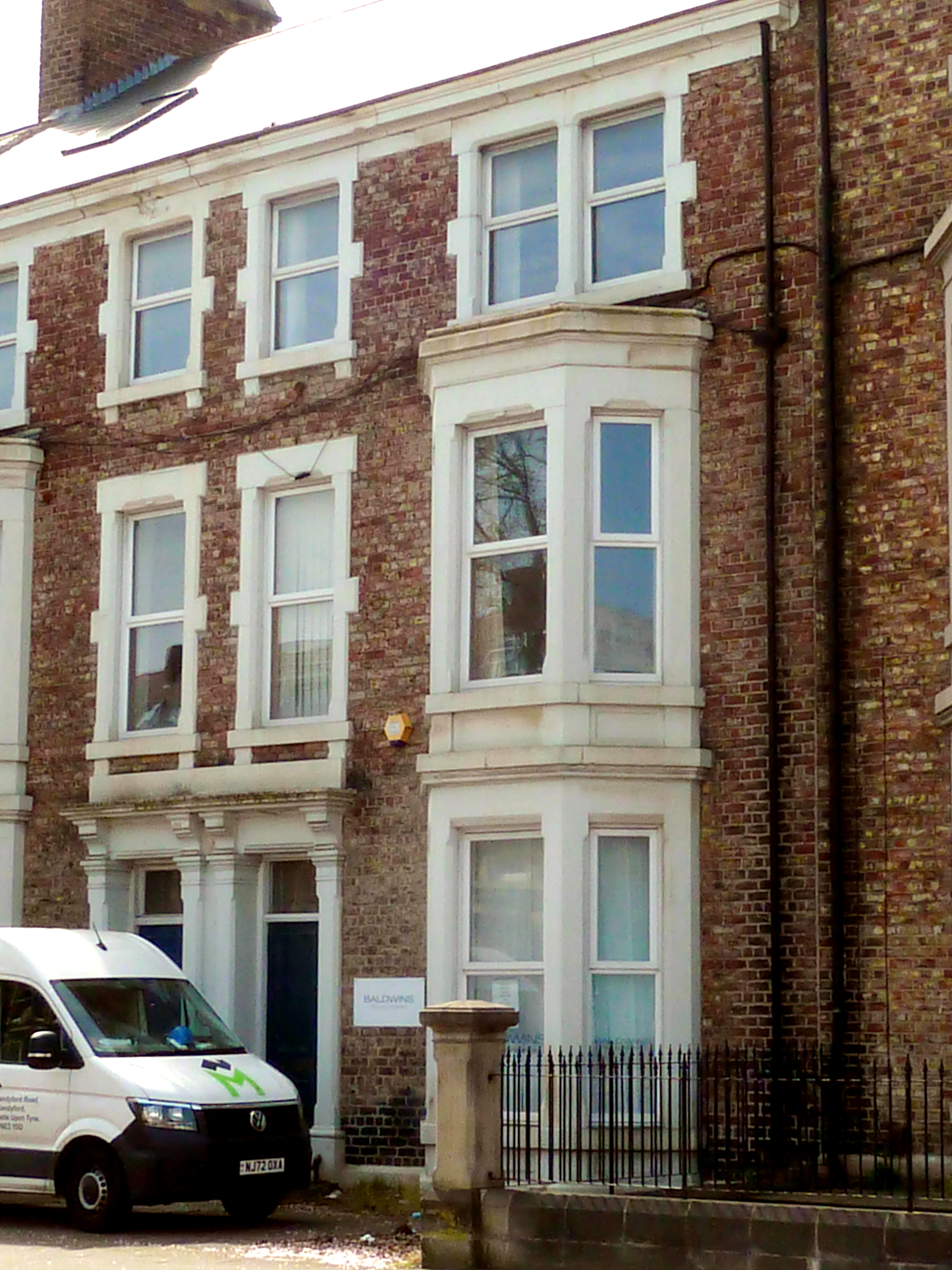
13 Portland Terrace, Beall's last residence

Although Beall made his name as a sculptor in Newcastle upon Tyne, his family background was in Lincolnshire and Rutland. His grandmother Elizabeth Beall née Frisby was born in Oakham, Rutland. (Note: Elizabeth Beall née Frisby (c.1773 – January 1854) GRO Index: Deaths Mar 1854 Beall Elizabeth Stamford 7a 178) Beall's father, plasterer and slater Eusebius Beall, was also born in Oakham, (Note: Eusebius Beall (10 February 1801 – 6 January 1876) GRO index: Deaths Mar 1876 Beall Eusebius. 74 Stamford 7a 211) and his mother Sarah Dalton was born in Horncastle, Lincolnshire. (Note: Sarah Dalton (c.1800 – 8 November 1868) GRO Index: Deaths Dec 1868 Beall Sarah 68 Stamford 7a 167)

Robert Beall was born in Stamford, Lincolnshire, around 1836. (Note: Some sources give his name as Robert L. Beall, but formal sources do not mention a middle name for Robert Beall (1835–1892). Beall was born some time between 1835 and 1837. Some censuses imply a birth date of 1836. His age at death in 1892 was given in newspapers as 55 years..) He had four younger brothers, all born in Stamford. By 1841 he was living with his grandmother - who was listed as a pauper - in Tinkey Lane, Oakham, Rutland. The 1851 census finds him at age 15 living in North Street, Stamford, with his parents and younger brothers.

On 14 June 1859 in Newcastle he married Mary Ann Burn, from Crookhill, who was about 16 years old, (Note: Mary Ann Burn (1843 – April 1887) GRO Index: Marriages Jun 1859 Beall Robert and Burn Mary, Newcastle On Tyne 10b 204) and they had six children, including Robert Eusebius Beall, who took over the business when his father died, and ran it until his own death in 1909. (Note: Robert Eusebius Beall (1860 –1909) GRO Index: Births Sep 1860 Beall Robert Eusebius Newcastle T 10b 27. Deaths Sep 1909 Beall Robert Eusebius 49 Newcastle T 10b 22. See Commons category:Caedmon's Cross, Whitby) In 1871 the family was living at 51 Elswick Road, Westgate, Newcastle, with five of their children. By 1881, the family had moved to 13 Portland Terrace, Jesmond, Newcastle. By 1891, Beall was a widower living with his two unmarried daughters at 13 Portland Terrace, Jesmond, Newcastle.

Beall died on 9 January 1892 at 13 Portland Terrace, Newcastle upon Tyne. He was interred in Elswick Cemetery on 13 January 1892. (Note: GRO Index: Deaths Mar 1892 Beall Robert 55 Newcastle T. 10b 100. Elswick Cemetery, St John's Road, Newcastle upon Tyne NE4 7XB, is also known as St John's Cemetery.) His will was proved at Newcastle upon Tyne on 15 October 1907. By 2013 the cemetery was in poor condition, but it received a grant for a conservation project in 2023.

== Career ==
Ward's Directory indicates that Beall's business originated as Walker & Emley, a firm of masons, smiths and ironfounders, which operated at 42–44 Westgate Road, Newcastle, and at the Neville Steam Marble and Granite Works at Gateshead. Beall joined them in the 1860s, as Walker, Emley & Beall, and that partnership continued into the 1870s. The business was registered at 9 Cottenham Street, then Elswick Row, in Newcastle between 1861 and the 1870s. From the 1880s, Beall ran the business as a sole trader, from 13 Portland Terrace, Newcastle. Another source suggests that ironmonger and ironfounder Henry Walker joined with Emley and Beall by 1876, and left the partnership in 1885. In the 1880s, the company was also known as Emley & Co., and Beall's sculptural work was sometimes credited under that company name.

Whatever the nature of the partnership, Beall was running the monumental masonry and sculpture company in Newcastle upon Tyne by 1861, when he was 25 years old. By that time he was employing five men and nine boys, so this setup must have had earlier beginnings with Walker & Emley. By 1871, as a marble merchant and master sculptor he was employing fifty-four men, sixteen boys and four women. (Note: In 19th century England, a master sculptor was one who was able to employ and train others in their skill; it did not imply academic qualifications.) By 1881, Beall was also selling granite, and his son Robert E. Beall, aged 20, was an assistant to his father. According to the 1891 census, he was no longer a stone merchant, but was still an architectural sculptor. The southernmost arch, and maybe a second arch of the railway bridge at Newcastle, was used as business premises by Beall from 1861. Its address was Castle Yard at High Level Approach or High Level End, but it was sometimes recorded as an adjunct to Castle Square or Queens Lane, Newcastle.

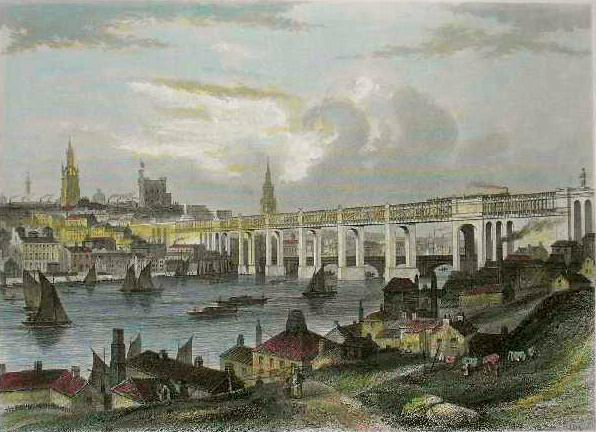
High Level Bridge, where Beall's yard was sited, 1863

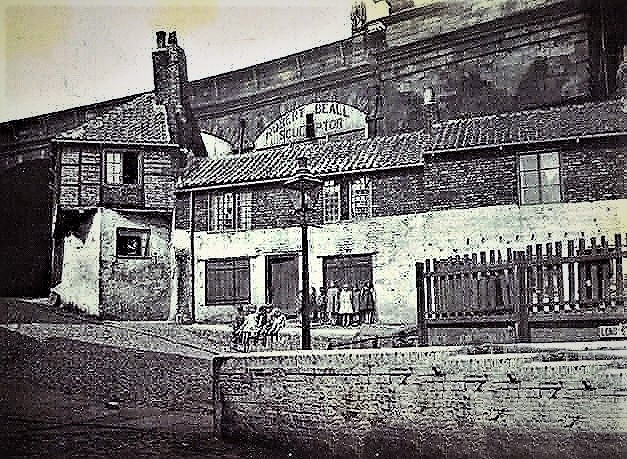
High Level Bridge Approach, the location of Beall's workshop from 1861

=== Apprentices ===
One of Beall's apprentices was John Rogers, (Note: John Rogers (1862 – April 1942) GRO index: Deaths Jun 1942 Rogers John 80 Newcastle T. 10b 144) who was employed by the firm for fifty-five years, and executed the twenty-five stone heads on Worswick Chambers, Newcastle, in 1891. Another apprentice was his own son, Robert Eusebius Beall, who later took over the business and sculpted Cædmon's Cross at Whitby in 1898.

== Selected works ==
=== Clock tower and drinking fountain, Tynemouth, 1861 ===
Beall executed the carvings on the Venetian Gothic clock tower and drinking fountain, also known as the Scott Clock Fountain, in Front Street, Tynemouth. Newspapers credited the design to architects Oliver & Lamb of Newcastle upon Tyne, and indeed the firm was awarded first premium for the design in 1860, and was calling for builders to tender for the work in January 1861. However, some newspapers said that the premium for the original design competition for the drinking fountain was awarded to the young architect Septimus Hird of Darlington, who drowned in the sea in July 1861, aged 17, before the building was completed. (Note: Septimus Hird (1843–1861), GRO index Births Sep 1843 Hird Septimus Darlington 24 58. Deaths Sep 1861 Hird Septimus Guisbro' 9d 305)

The clock tower was funded by Tynemouth-born William Scott at a cost of up to £500 (equivalent to £51,457 in 2025), and inaugurated on 2 September 1861. The original inscription on the clock tower said, "Erected by William Scott, Esq., of London, and presented to the Mayor, Aldermen and Burgesses of Tynemouth, 1861". The Newcastle Guardian and Tyne Mercury said, "Around the erection, and giving it an artistic effect, is a variety of carving, consisting chiefly of natural foliage, the work of Mr Beale (sic) of Newcastle". The clock tower was described by the Newcastle Journal as follows:

The structure ... combines a clock tower, fountains, marine barometer, and thermometer. The tower is divided into three stages. In the upper stage is placed the clock ... The middle stage is occupied by ornamental openings, filled with pierced tracery. The lower stage has handsome granite drinking fountains, on the north and south sides ...The materials employed in the erection are stone, red and blue bricks, and polished Aberdeen granite, the effect of which, as applied in the design, is exceedingly striking and novel. The carving, executed by Mr Beale (sic), sculptor, Newcastle, is very pretty, and executed in a highly artistic manner ... The basins for the drinking fountains are of a handsome appearance, and polished both outside and inside. The water flows from a mass of rocks, out of which spring an elegant group of water flowers, and beneath the basins are drinking troughs for dogs ... A good effect is produced in the middle stage by the insertion of polished red granite columns.

The inauguration of the clock tower began with a procession from the Bath Hotel. It featured Tynemouth's mayor and corporation, a company of the First Northumberland Artillery Corps, the North Shields Rifle Corps (NCRC) band, and Reverend T. Featherstone, who was the primary instigator of the building of the clock. Having mentioned in his speech that the fountain water of the clock tower was better than that drawn at home by the town's population, the mayor declared the clock tower open. Along with his corporation, the mayor celebrated the occasion by drinking some of the water from a silver cup, while a 21-gun salute was fired from the Castle Yard by the Northumberland Artillery Corps, after which the NSRC band played the National Anthem. This celebration incurred a cost to the town corporation of £8 8s 9d (equivalent to £868.59 in 2025), for 117 suppers, 29 gallons of beer and 11 bottles of soda water.

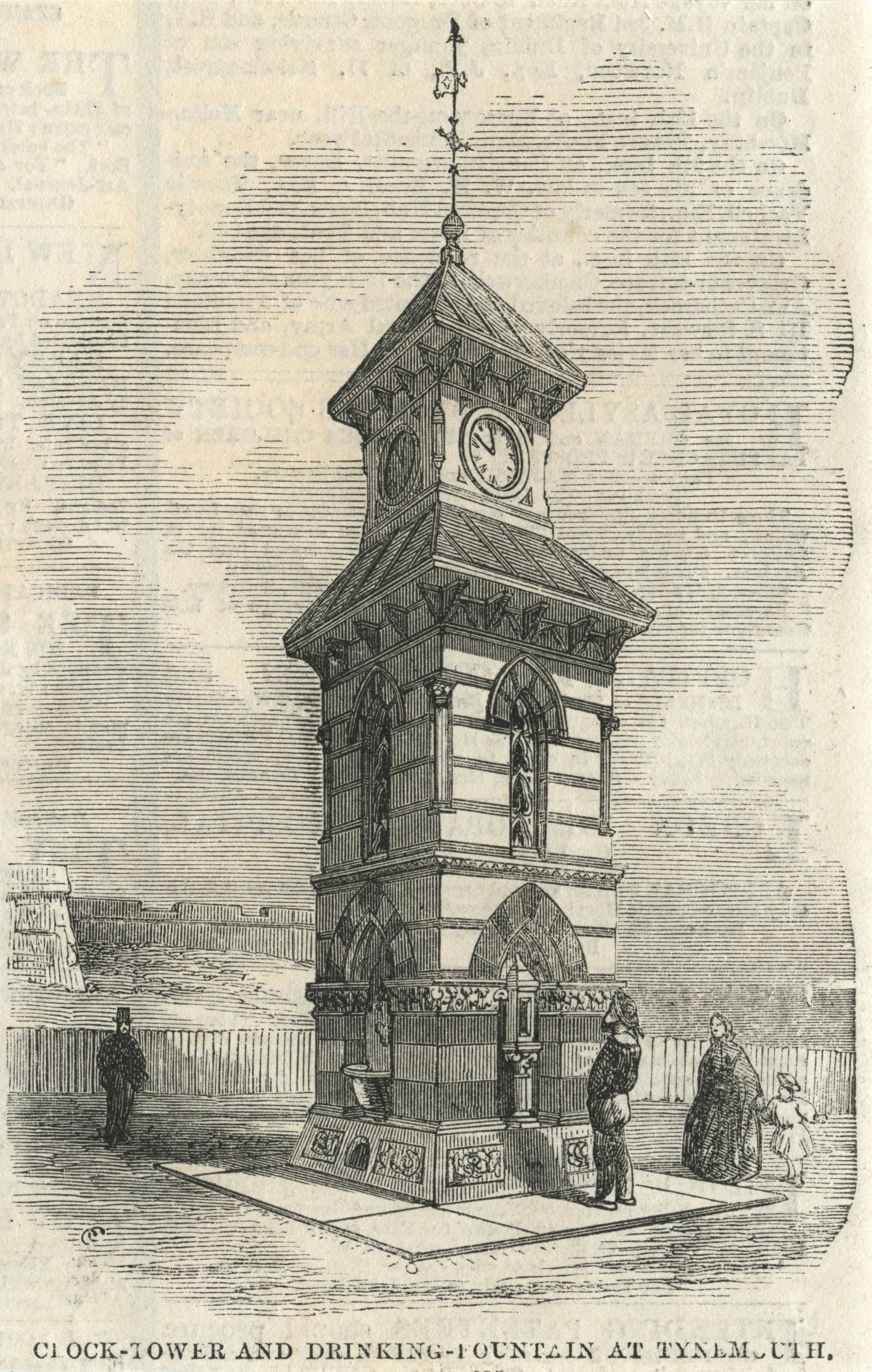
Clock tower, Tynemouth, in 1861

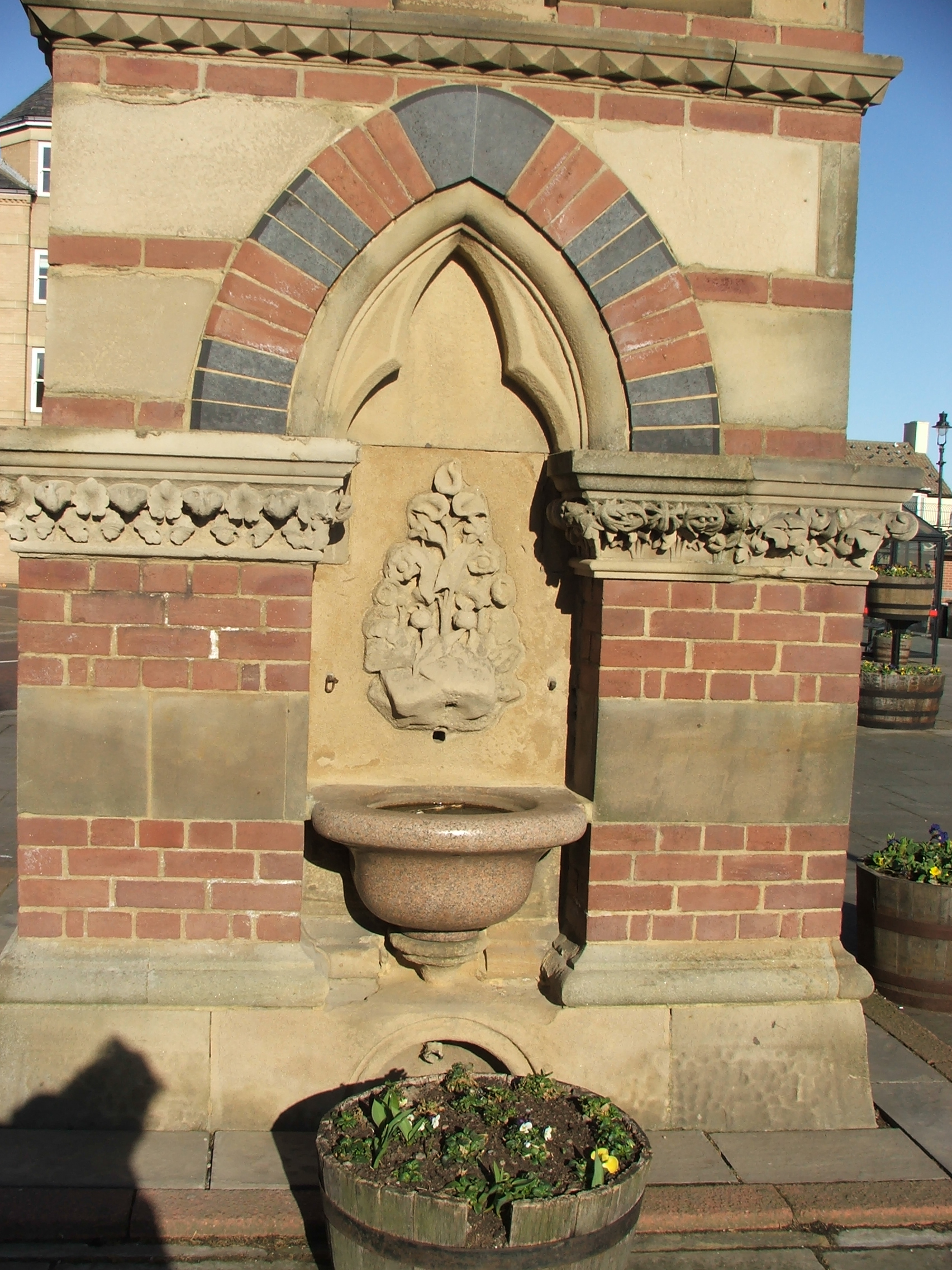
Clock tower, Tynemouth, in 2012

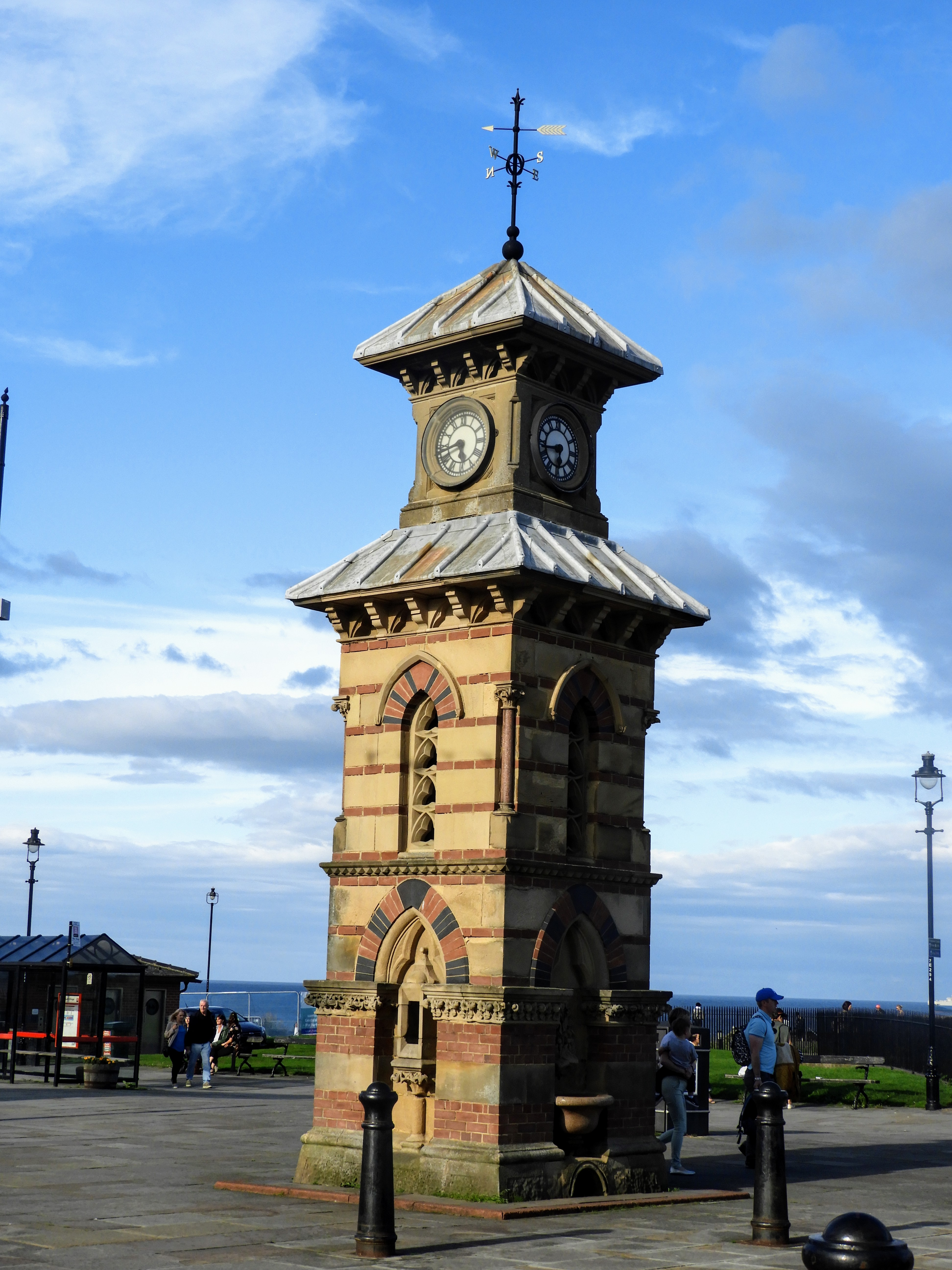
Clock tower, Tynemouth, in 2019

=== St Mary's Church, Nun Monkton, 1869–1873 ===
This is a Grade I listed building, founded in the 12th or 13th century. Costing £4,400 (equivalent to £413,635 in 2025), It was restored to designs by architect John Wilson Walton, (Note: Architect John Wilson Walton of 12 Buckingham Street, London WC (Post Office London Directory 1870) and Shotley Hall, Northumberland. This is John Wilson Walton-Wilson (1823–1910). See "Walton-Wilson, John Wilson", in Brodie, Antonia (2001) Directory of British Architects, 1834-1914 Vol. 2 (L-Z), ISBN 9780826455147, Bloomsbury Academic, page 909.) and re-opened and consecrated by the Bishop of Ripon, on 16 October 1873, after three hundred years of neglect. The reredos and pulpit were executed by Beall. The York Herald describes the reredos thus:

The reredos is of five compartments. That in the centre is of large size, and has a cinquefoiled head. The two compartments on each side are of smaller size, with trefoil heads [they were not yet filled with statuary]. The compartments are divided from each other by serpentine marble shafts.The canopy is of Caen stone, and elaborately carved. The heads at the intersection of the pediment are surmounted with finials of the Early English Period, carved in a very rich manner. The central pediment rises above the clerestory string course [its niche and side panels were not yet filled with the intended crucifixion and saint figures] ... The pulpit is remarkably beautiful, and is of various coloured marbles and Caen stone.

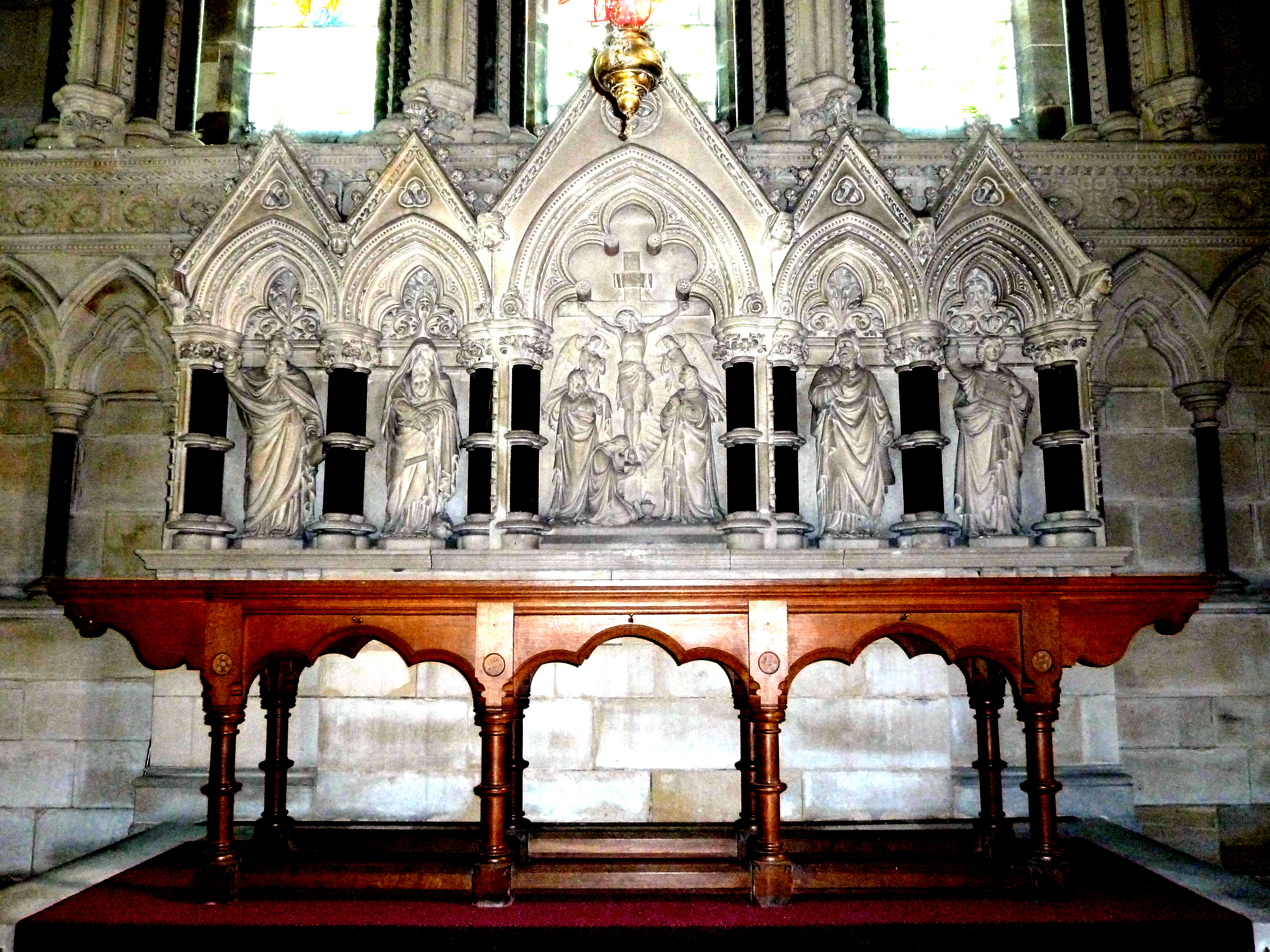
Reredos, Nun Monkton, 1873

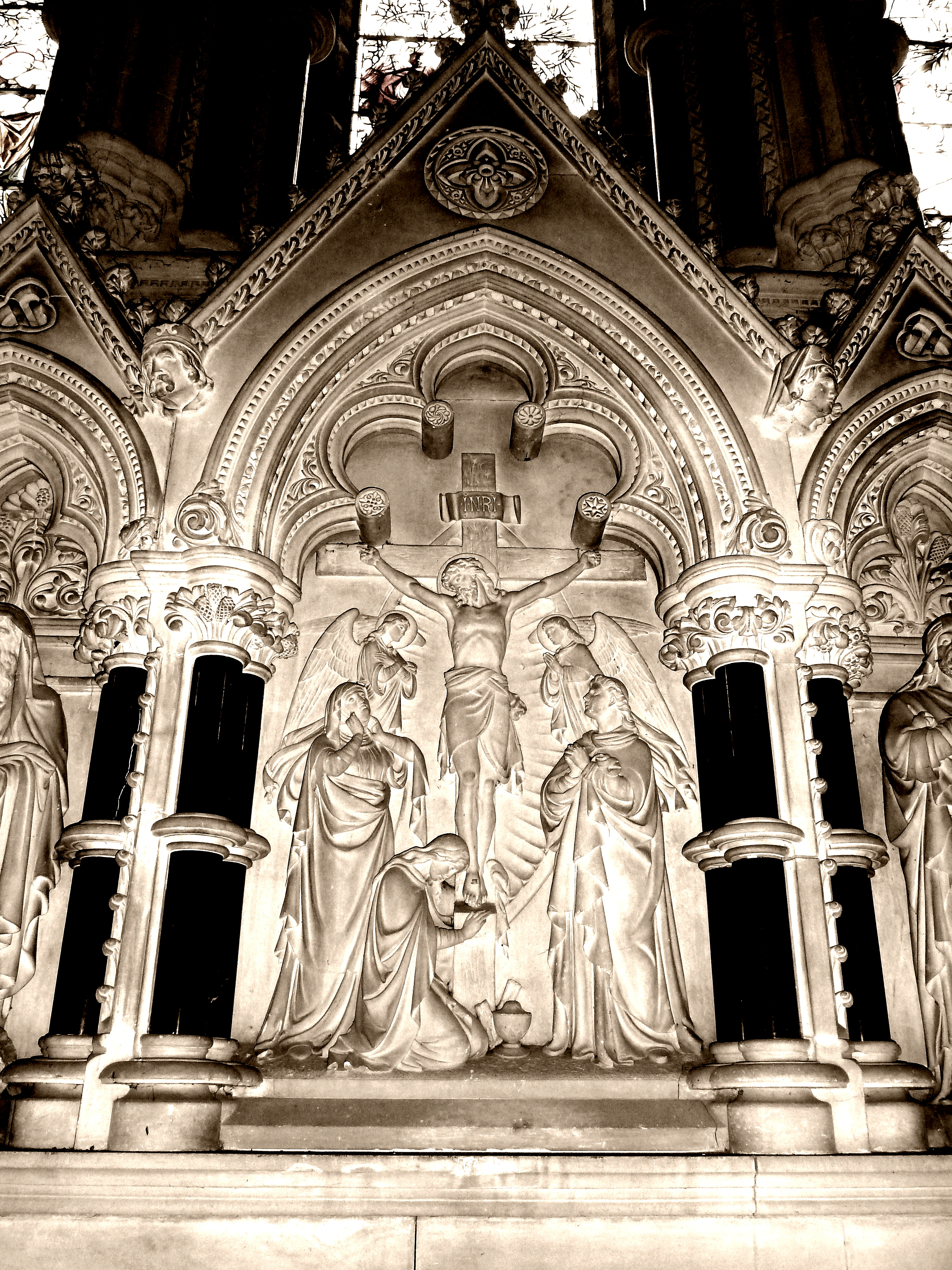
Crucifixion relief on reredos, Nun Monkton, 1873

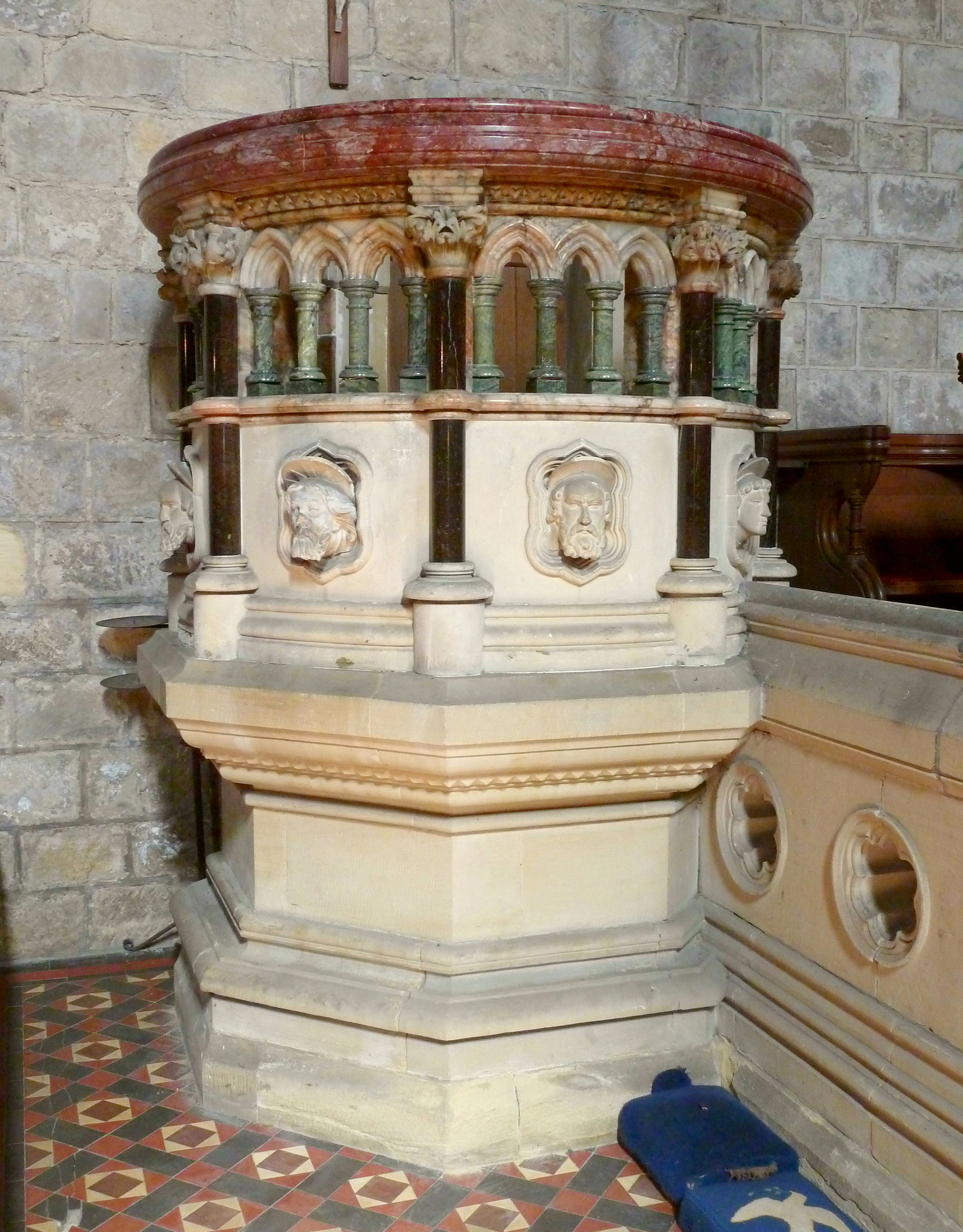
Pulpit, Nun Monkton, 1873

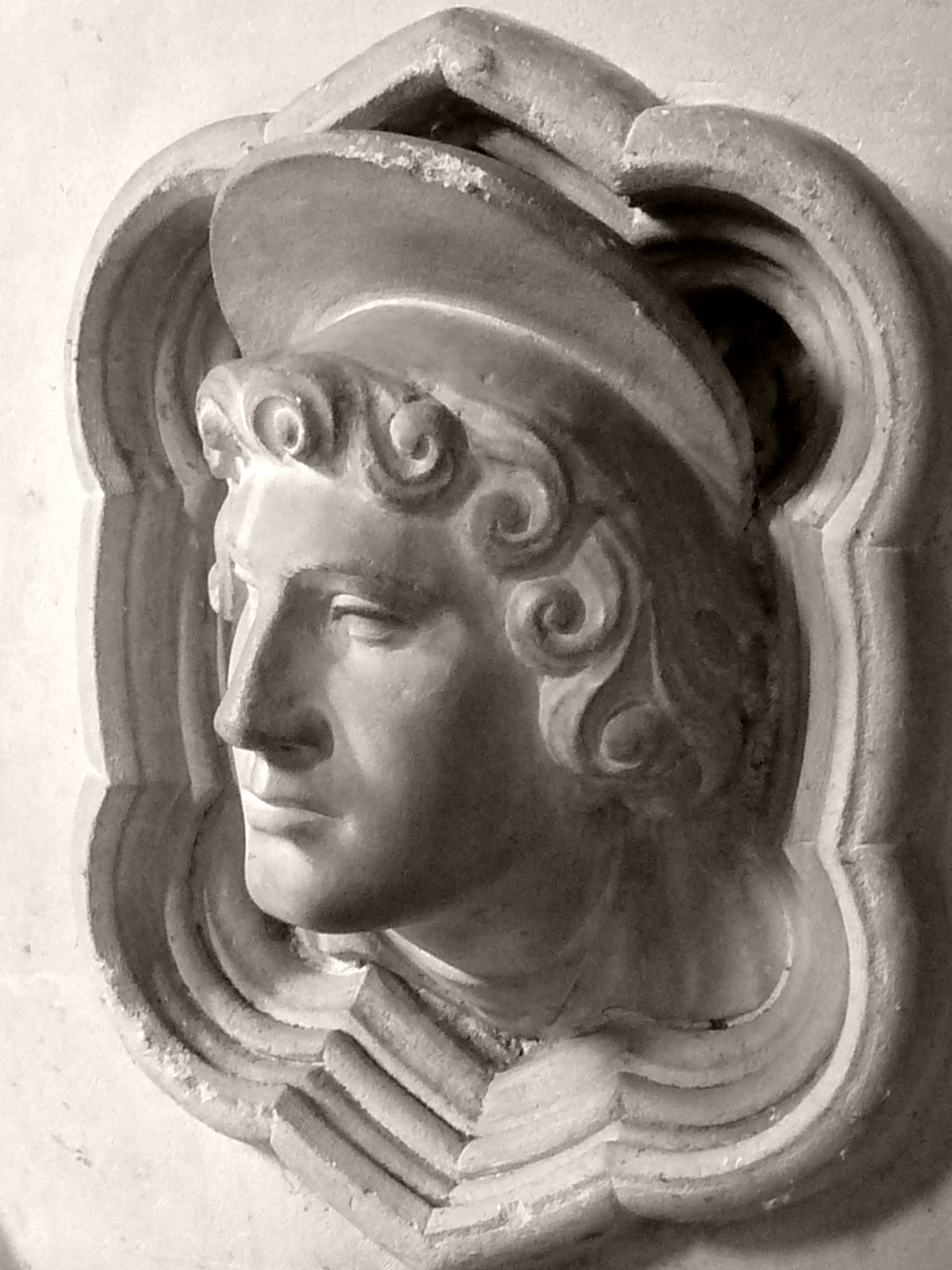
Saint's head on pulpit, Nun Monkton, 1873

=== Shakespeare Fountain, Leicester Square, London, 1874 ===
This is a listed building. Beall, for Walker, Emley and Beall, constructed the Shakespeare Fountain in Leicester Square, Westminster, London, in 1874. It is a water fountain with trough and pump, made of Sicilian marble, and funded by the financier Albert Grant. Also involved in the execution of the fountain were Italian-born sculptor Giovanni Fontana (c. 1821–1893), (Note: For more information on Giovanni Fontana (1821–1893) see Mapping Sculpture: Giovanni Fontana) and sculptor John Daymond II (1821–1898) of John Daymond & Son, London. (Note: For more information on John Daymond II (1821–1898) see Mapping Sculpture: John Daymond and Victorian Web.)

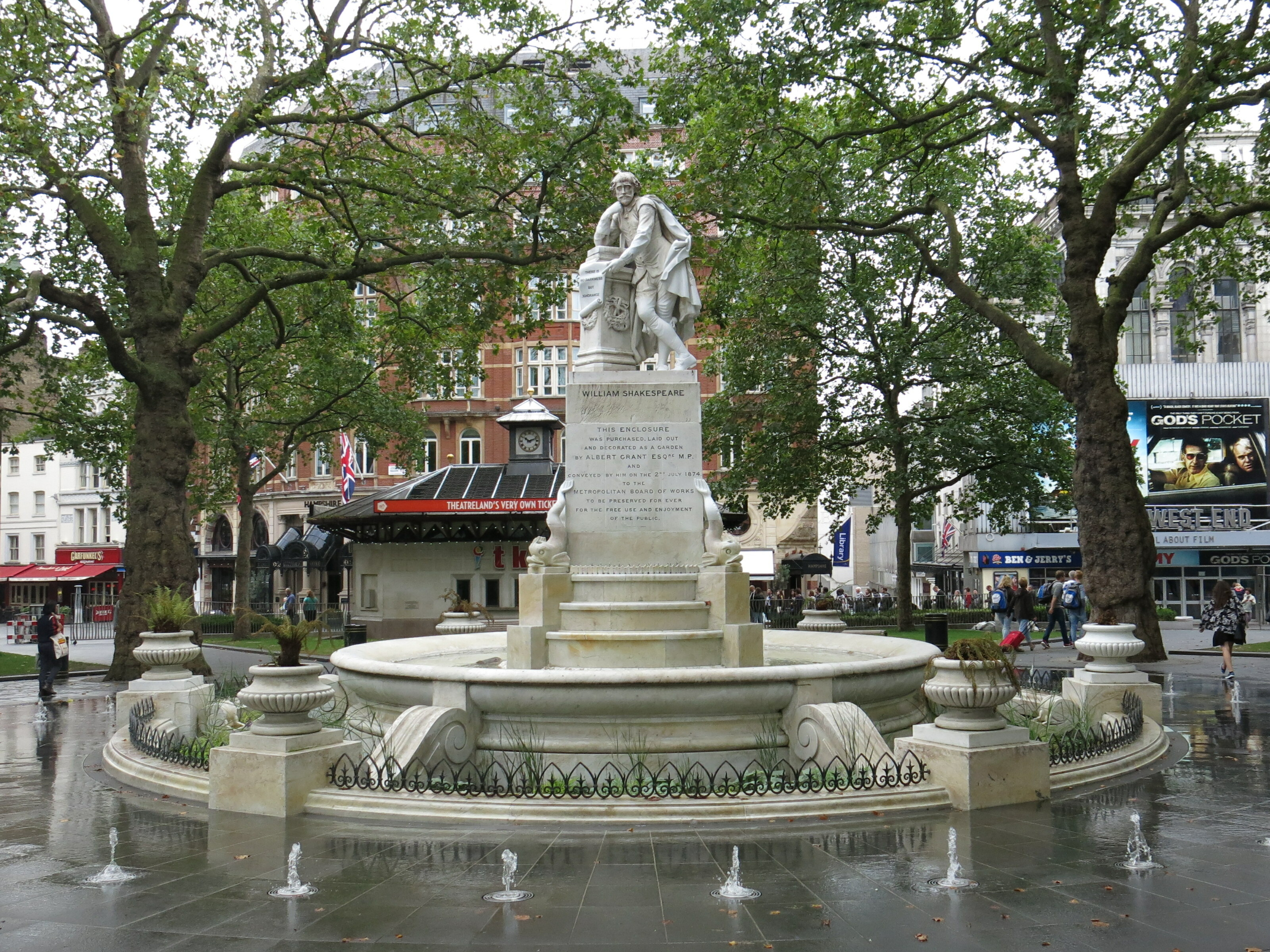
Shakespeare fountain, Leicester Square, 1874

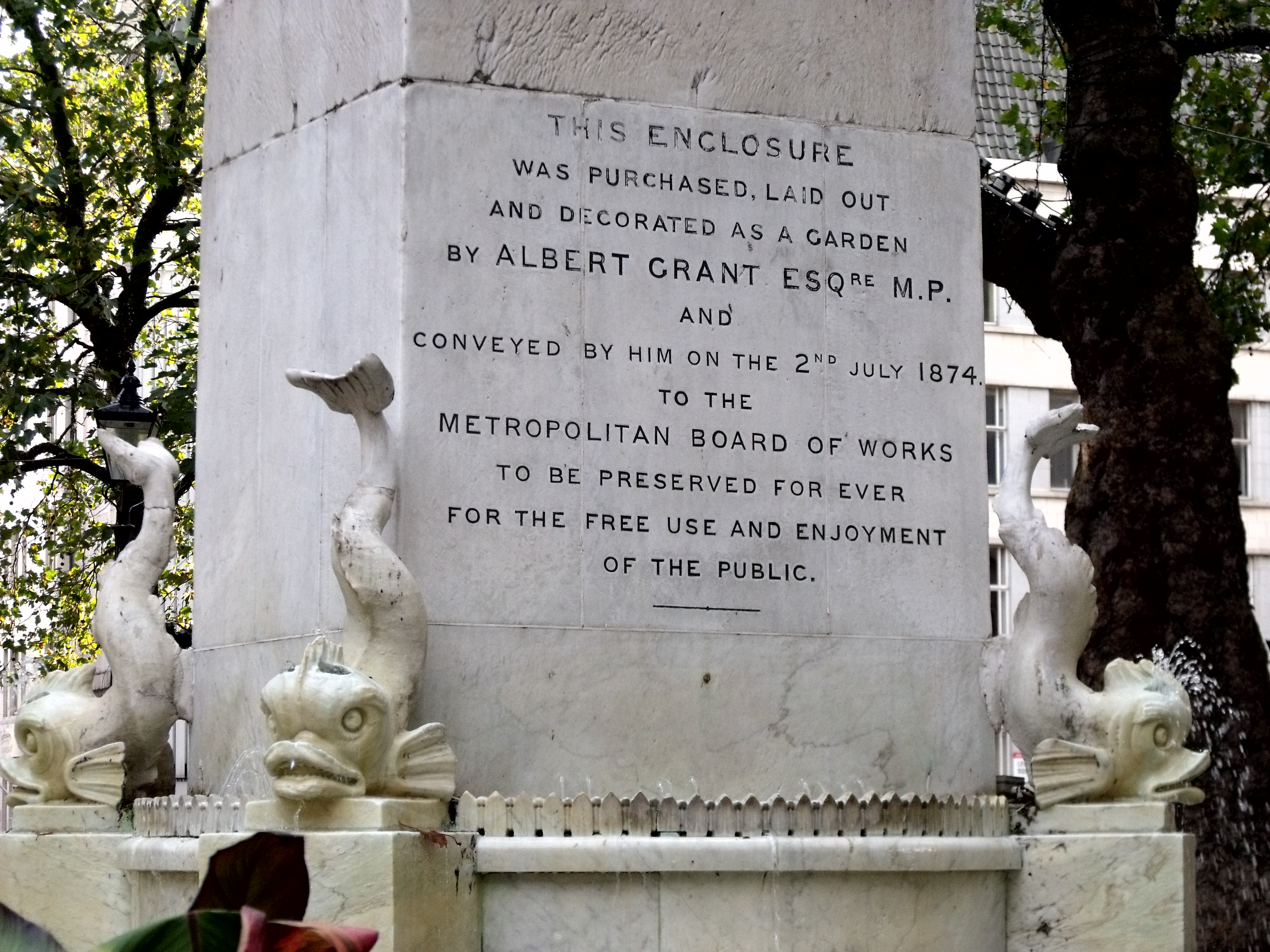
Shakespeare fountain, detail

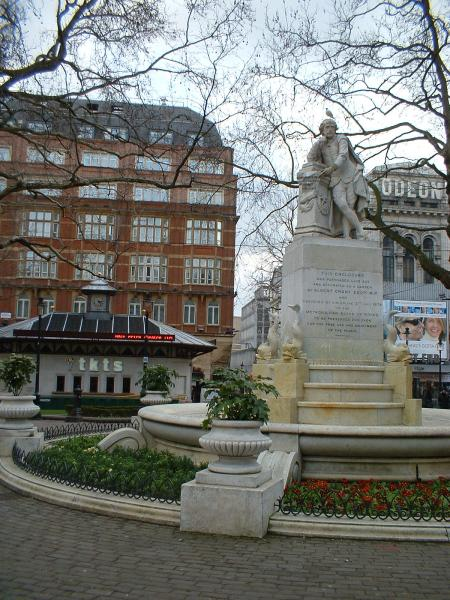
Shakespeare fountain, the trough

=== Pulpit and reredos in St Nicholas' Cathedral, Newcastle, 1882 ===
This is a Grade I listed building. In 1882, St Nicholas Parish Church became Newcastle Cathedral. Around that time, Beall carved the Uttoxeter marble pulpit with its alabaster figures, designed by architect Robert James Johnson for the cathedral. (Note: Robert James Johnson (1832–1892)) It features figures of John the Baptist and saints Peter, Paul, Barnabas and Philip. At some point between 1873 and 1887, Beall carved the decorative framework and smaller figures of the reredos in Uttoxeter marble and alabaster, in the same building. James Sherwood Westmacott carved the sixteen larger Caen stone figures in the niches of the reredos.

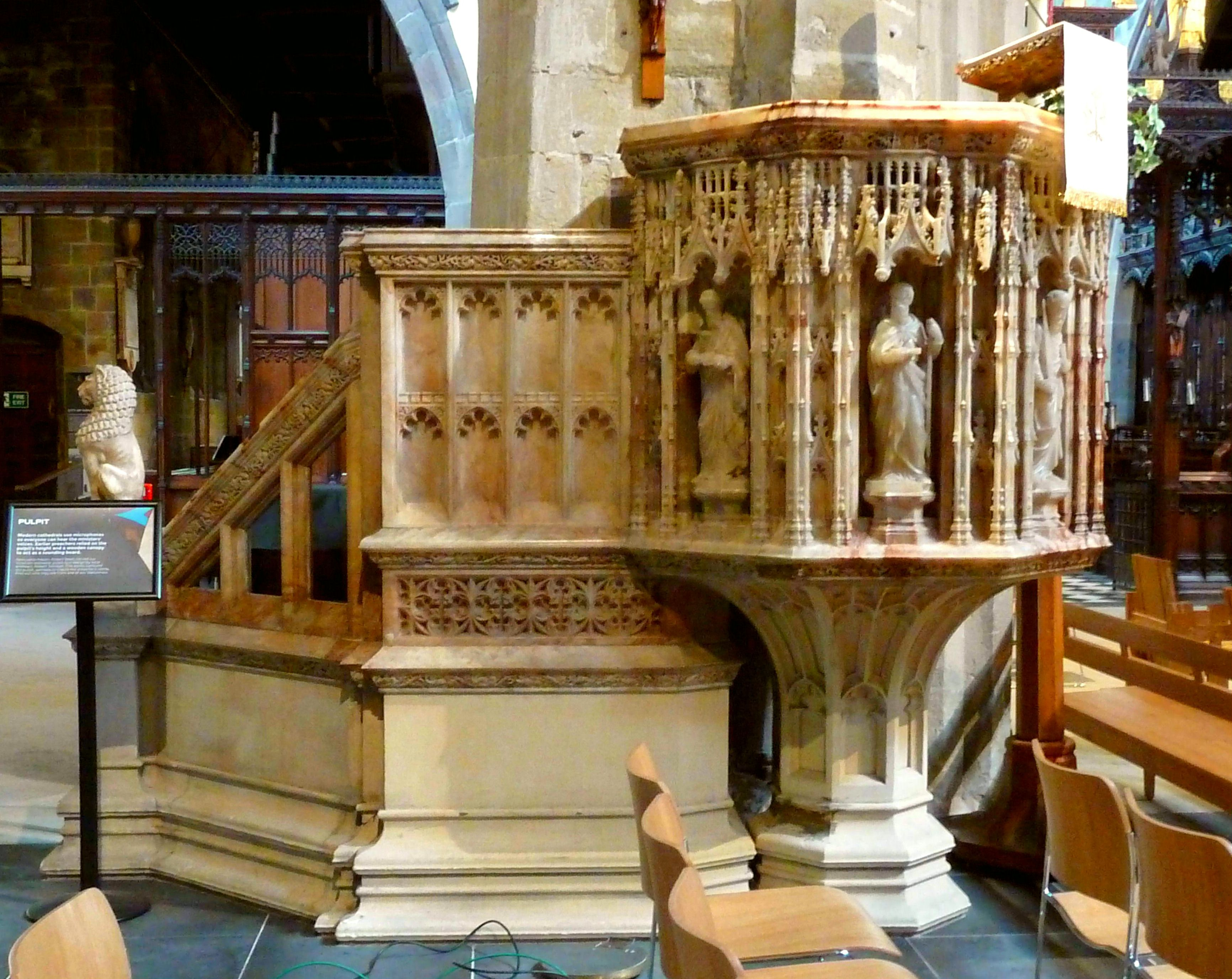
Pulpit by Beall, Newcastle Cathedral, 1882

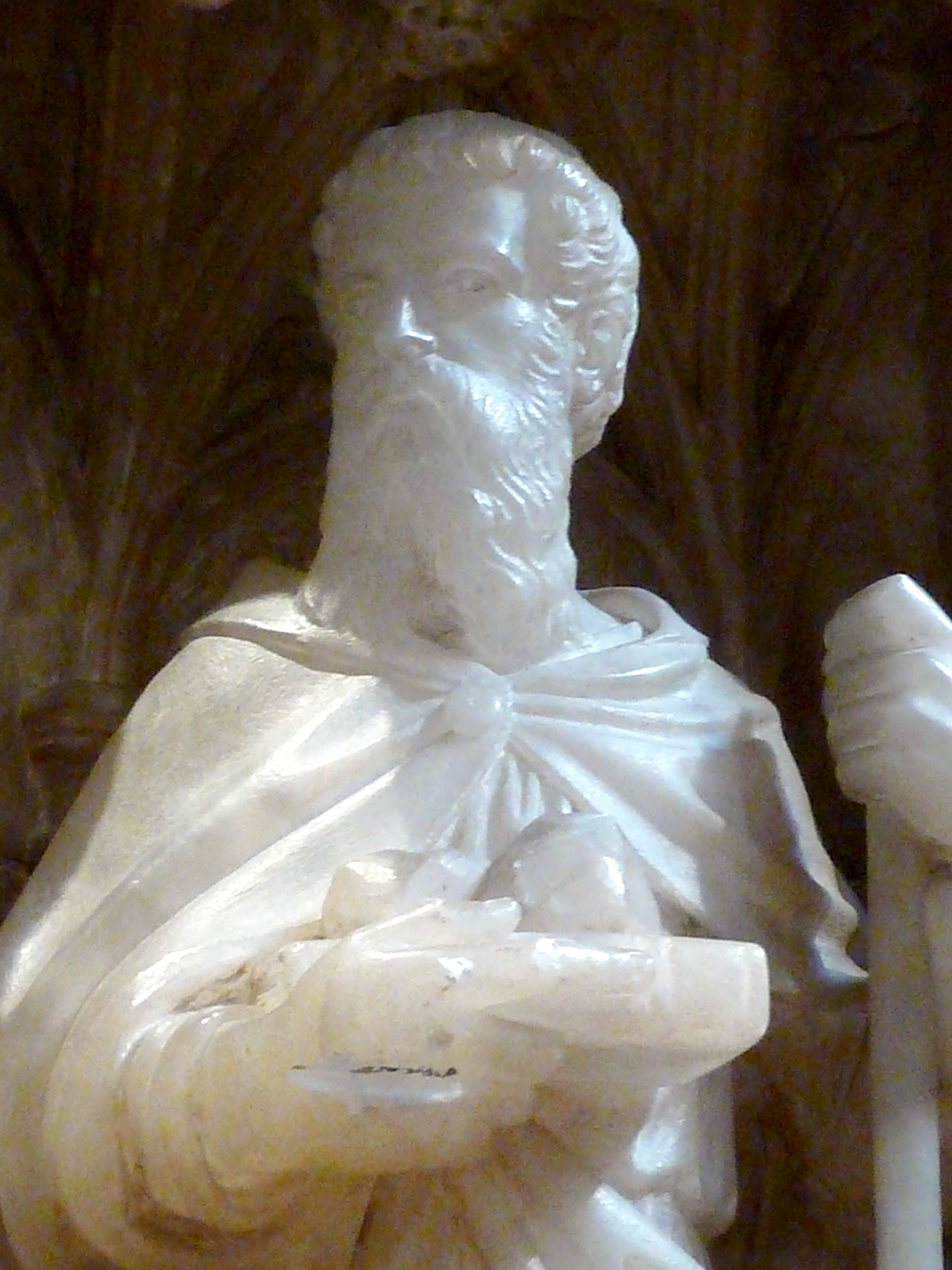
Alabaster figure by Beall on pulpit, Newcastle Cathedral, 1882

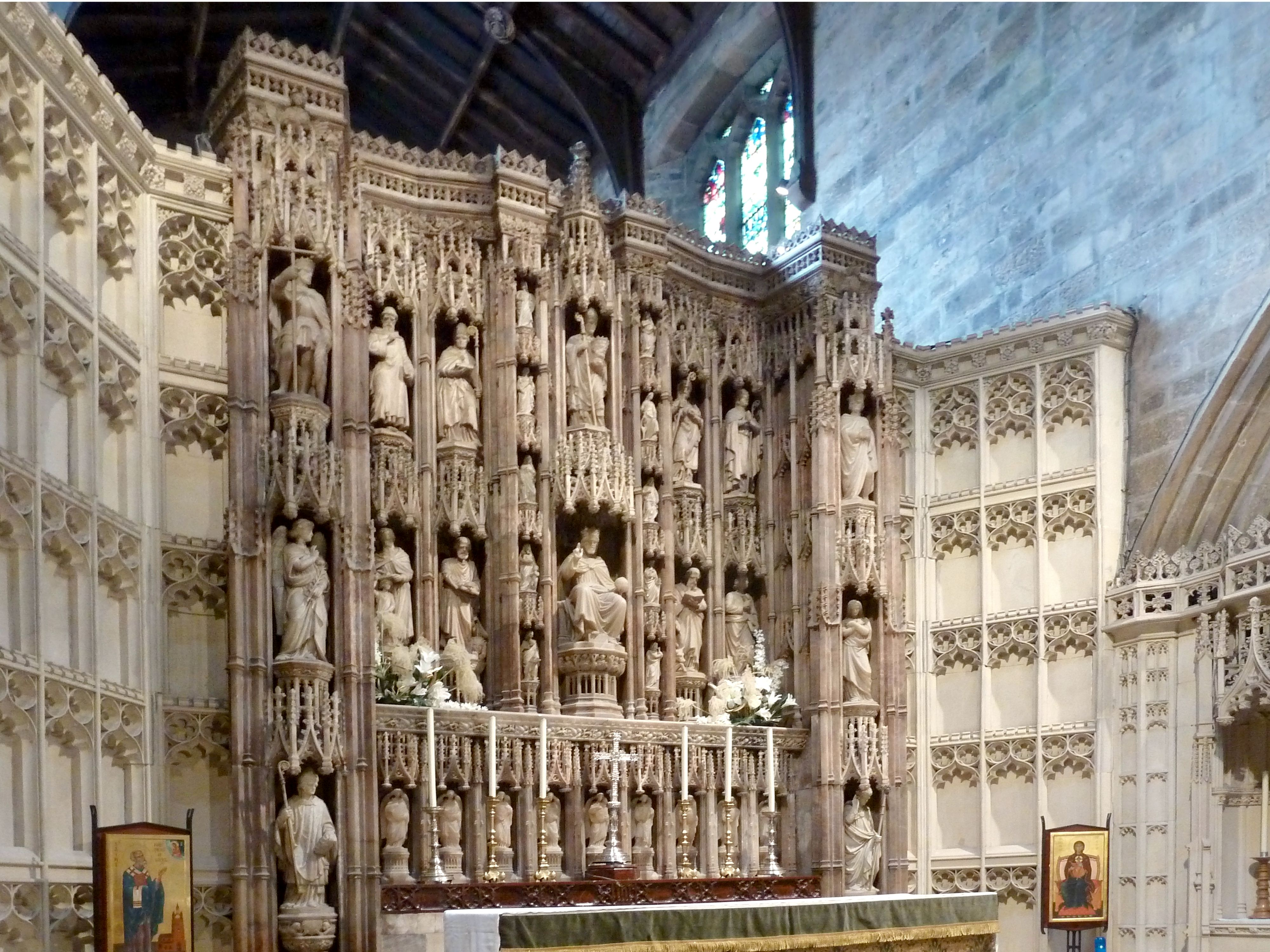
Reredos by Beall, with Westmacott's 16 figures, Newcastle Cathedral, 1873–1887

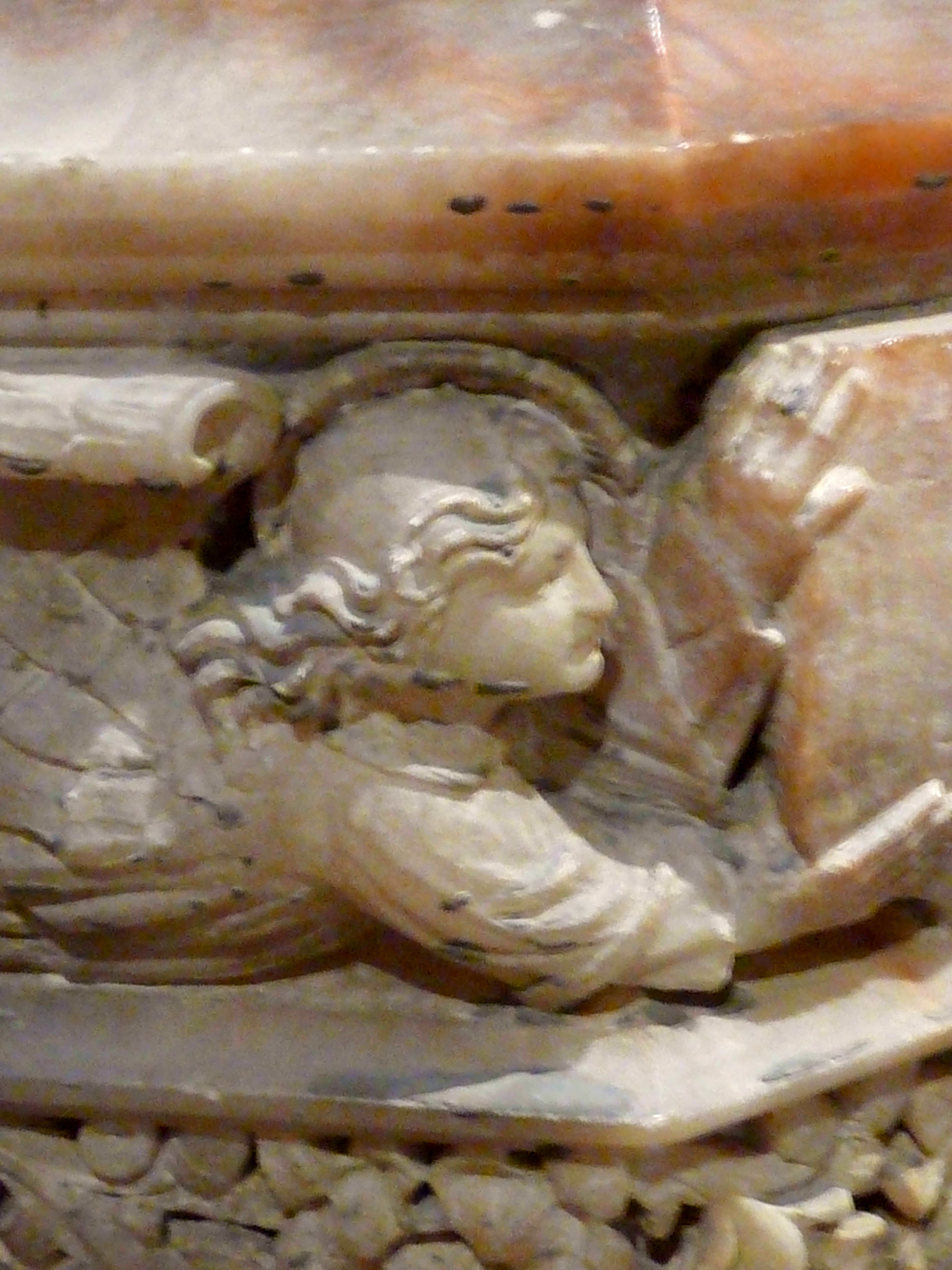
Angel by Beall, on reredos framework, Newcastle Catedral, 1873–1887

=== Stone cross, St Mary's Abbey churchyard, Blanchland, 1882 ===
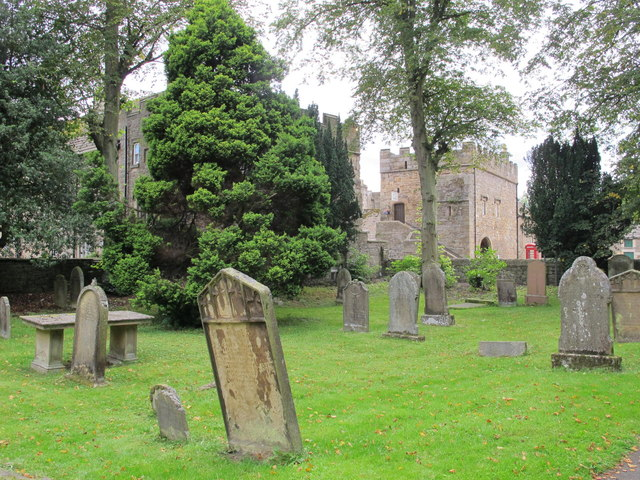
Blanchland Abbey churchyard

Beall erected a "beautifully polished grey granite" memorial cross for a young man in the churchyard of Blanchland Abbey Church, in 1882. (Note: The gravestone cross of Robert Snowball can be seen here.) Robert Snowball had been killed at home in Belmount, near Townfield, County Durham, on 1 January 1880. The monument is 6 ft 6in high, on a 3ft square base. It is inscribed, "Erected in affectionate remembrance of Robert Snowball of Belmount aged 26 years. He was cruelly murdered at that place on 1st January 1880". Farmers Robert Snowball and his father, and their servant Jane Barron aged 27, lived in a lonely farmhouse on the moor at Belmount. After Robert Snowball told Barron at dinner that he "knew about her lad", he was found dead the next morning in the farm loft on 1 January 1880, his skull battered from behind with a stone-breaking hammer. At the inquest, Barron was found not guilty. No stranger had been observed near the farmhouse around the time of the murder. However, by May 1880, Barron had been incarcerated in an asylum on the grounds of increasing violence and "ravings".

=== St George's Church, Jesmond, 1888 ===
This is a Grade I listed building. St George's Church, Jesmond, was designed by architect Thomas Ralph Spence and consecrated by the Bishop of Newcastle on 16 October 1888. (Note: Thomas Ralph Spence (1845-1918). GRO index: Deaths Jun 1918 Spence Thomas R 72 Bromley 2a 672) The whole was funded by Charles Mitchell of Jesmond Towers. Beall carved the "very tall" baptistry screen "filled with Caen stone carved in crocketed tracery and niches" at the west end of the church, around the same year. As viewed from the nave, it frames the west window of the church, and a bronze statue of St George by Spence. Beall also carved the Pavonazzo marble font, reredos and altar, under his company name of Emley & Co. of Newcastle. (Note: Beall probably executed the carved and pillared marble base for the wooden pulpit in Jesmond St George, which was created at the same time, since that base is of a structure and materials not unlike the base of the font) The combined reredos and altar unit includes mosaics by C. Mitchel (son of the church's benefactor), of Archangel Gabriel, Jesus and Archangel St Michael, and was exhibited at the Newcastle Jubilee Exhibition of 1887. (Note: The St Michael mosaic in St George's Church, Jesmond, was identified as such in 1888, but has since been confused with St George due to the inclusion of the dragon and the Saint George's Cross) Of the reredos and font, the Newcastle Chronicle said:

The two top steps of the sanctuary are of Pavonazzo marble, the third step being of rouge jasper, and the fourth and fifth of the finest Sienna marble. The dado is formed of dark English marble, surmounted with specially designed emblematical tiles. Above the reredos there is some beautiful stonework and three figures in mosaic, one of Our Lord, the others being of archangels; the whole terminating in a cross ... The font ... is exceedingly beautiful, even amidst its ornate surroundings. The bowl of the font, which is of large size, is cut out of a solid block of onyx, its appearance being very striking. It is supported by rouge jasper marble columns on an alabaster base.

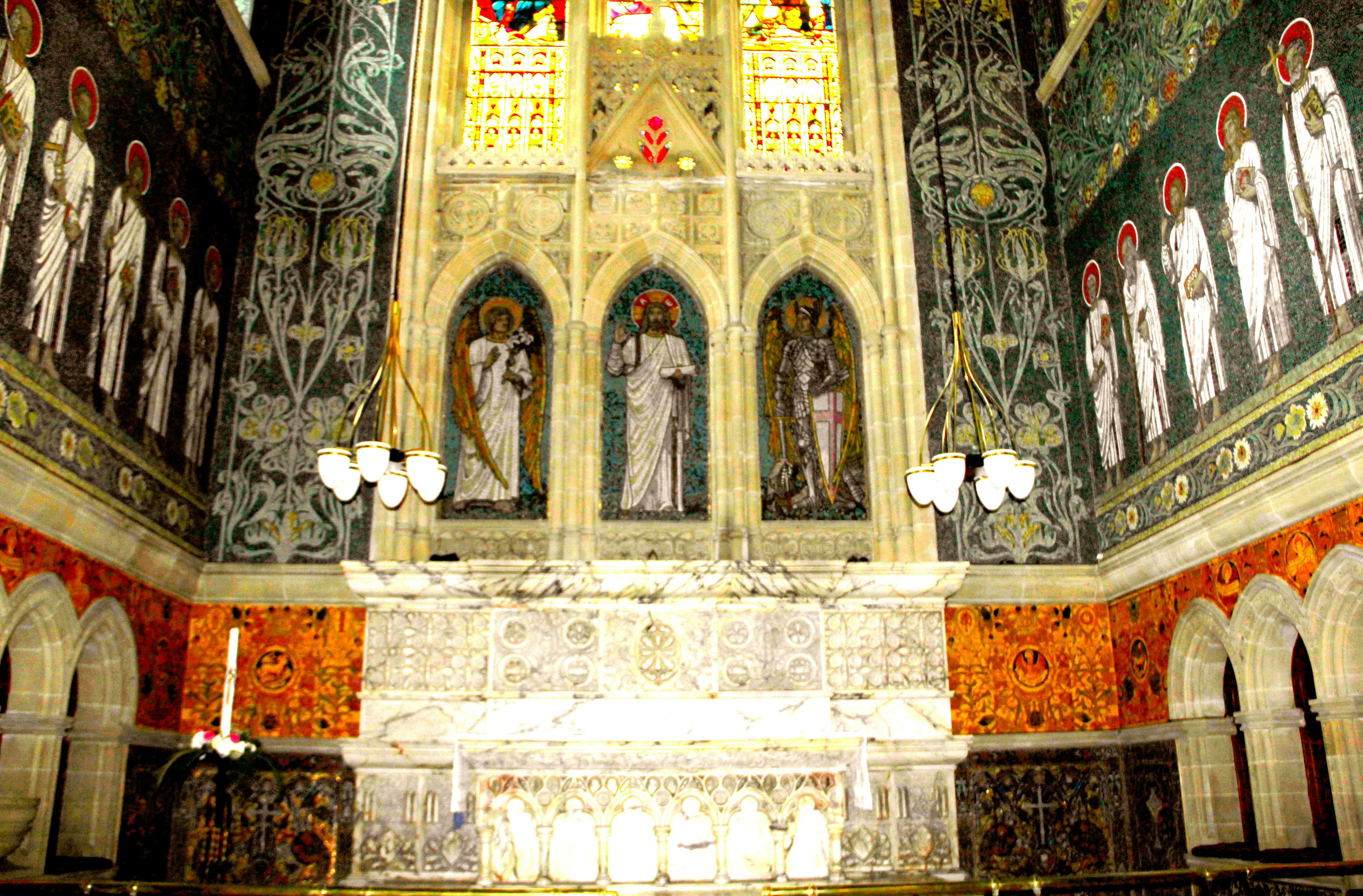
Reredos and altar, 1887

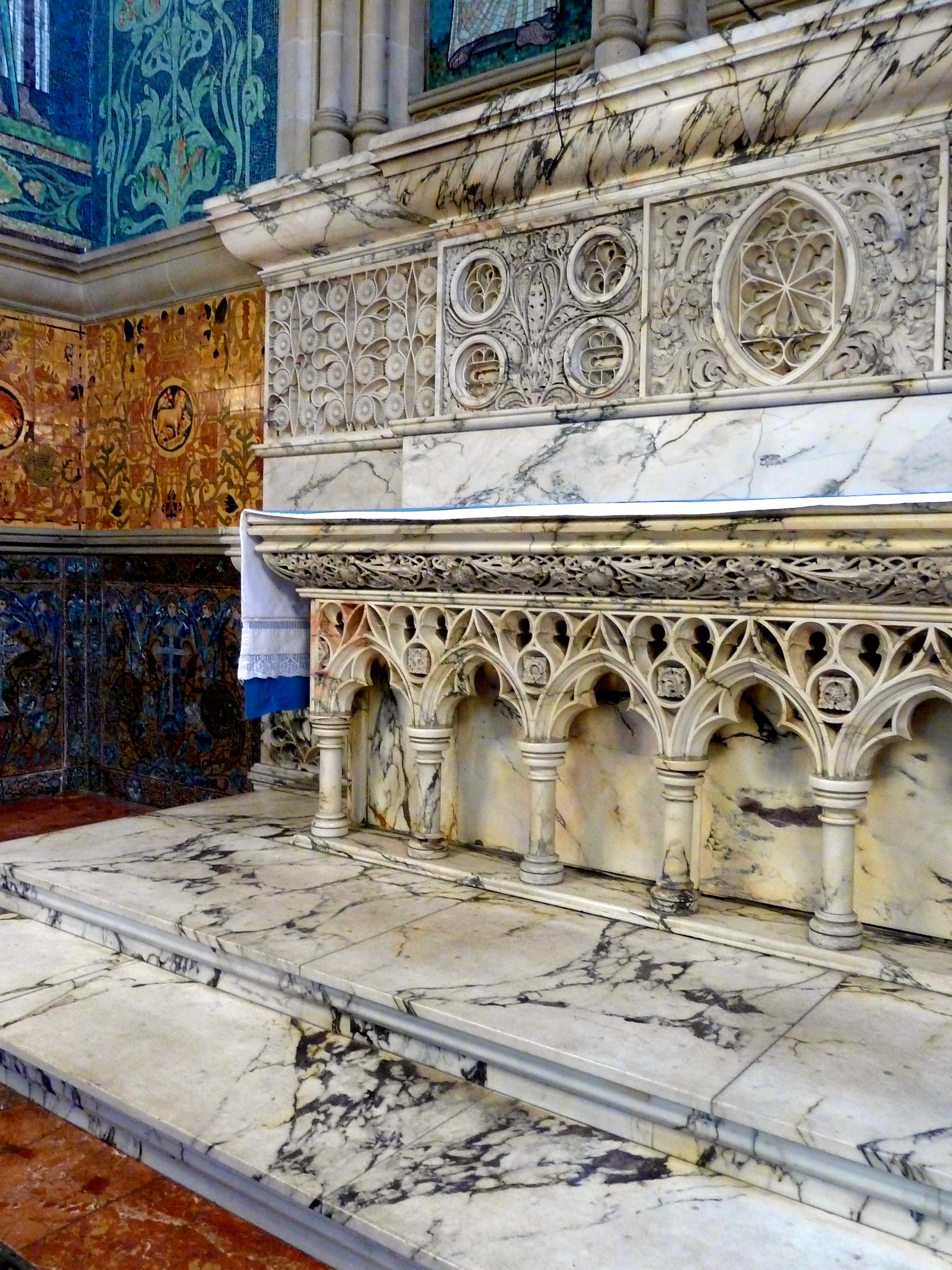
Reredos and altar, 1887 (detail)

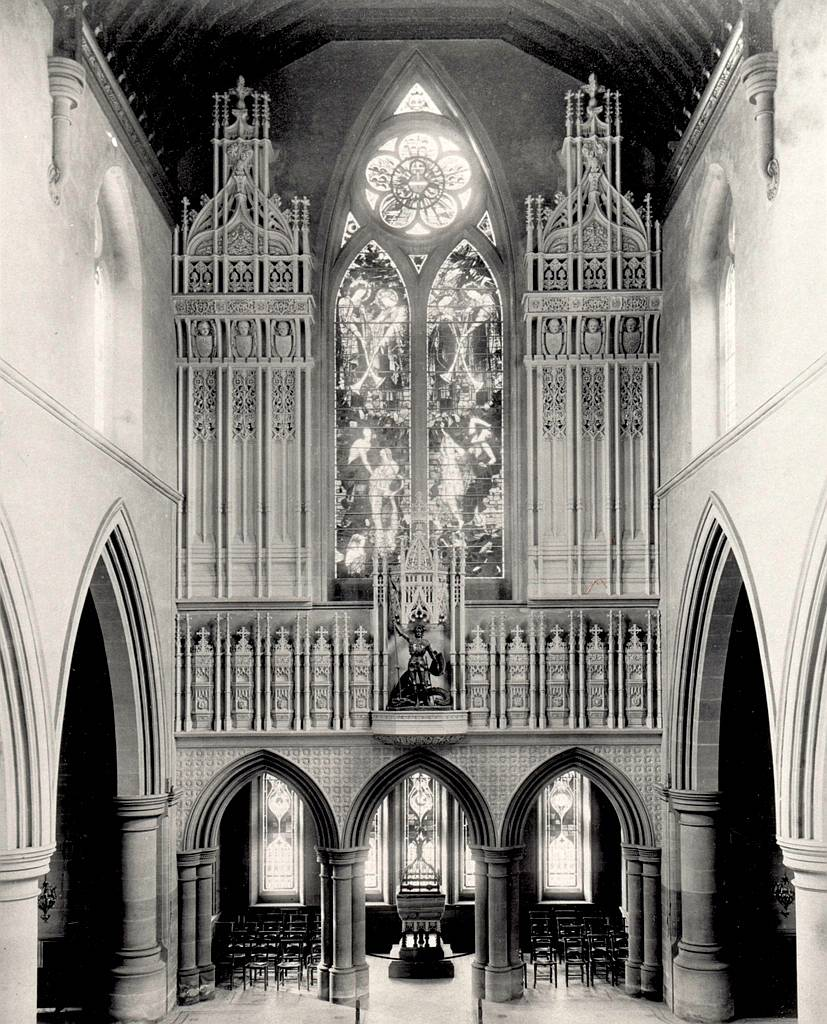
Baptistry screen, 1888

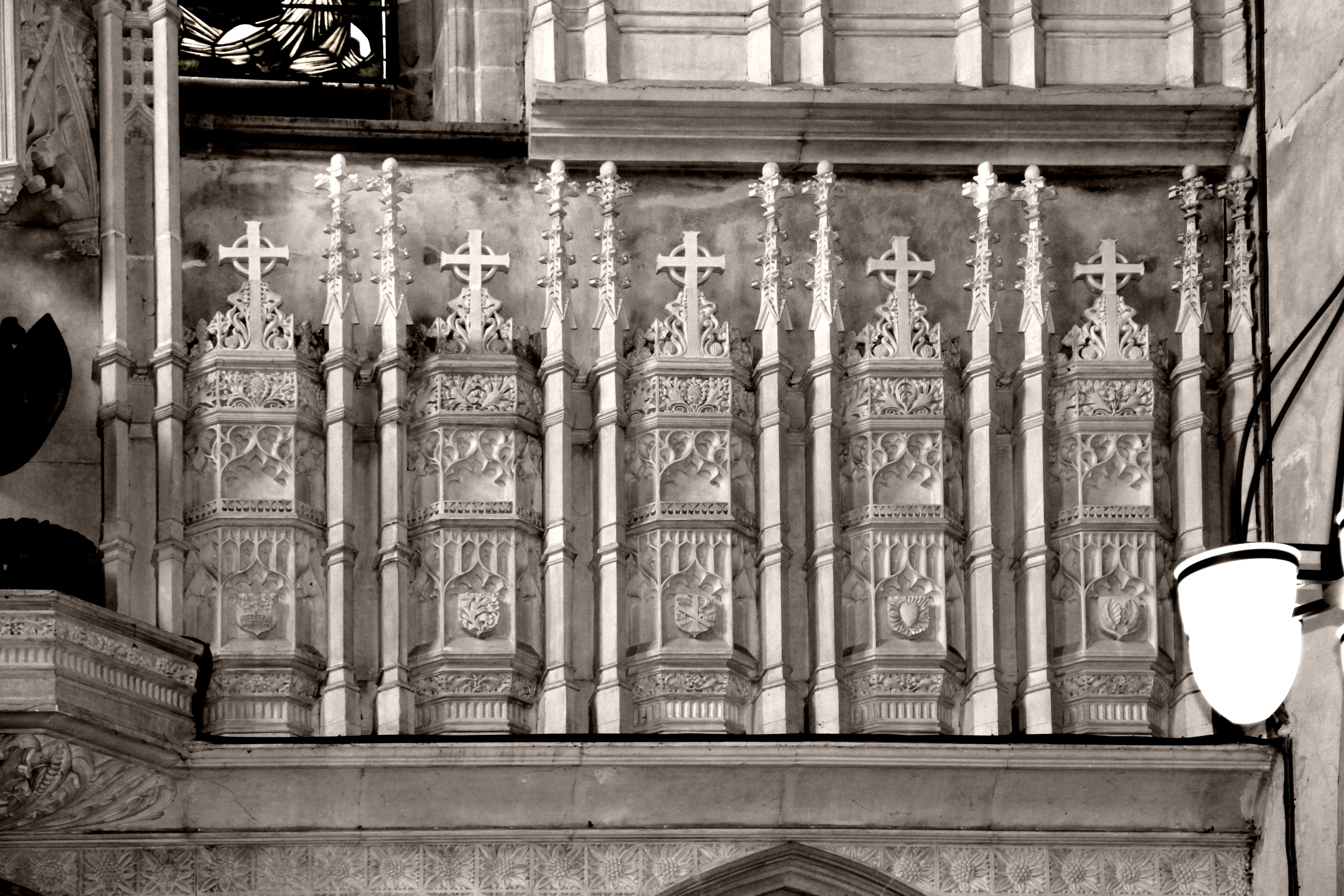
Baptistry screen, 1888 (detail)

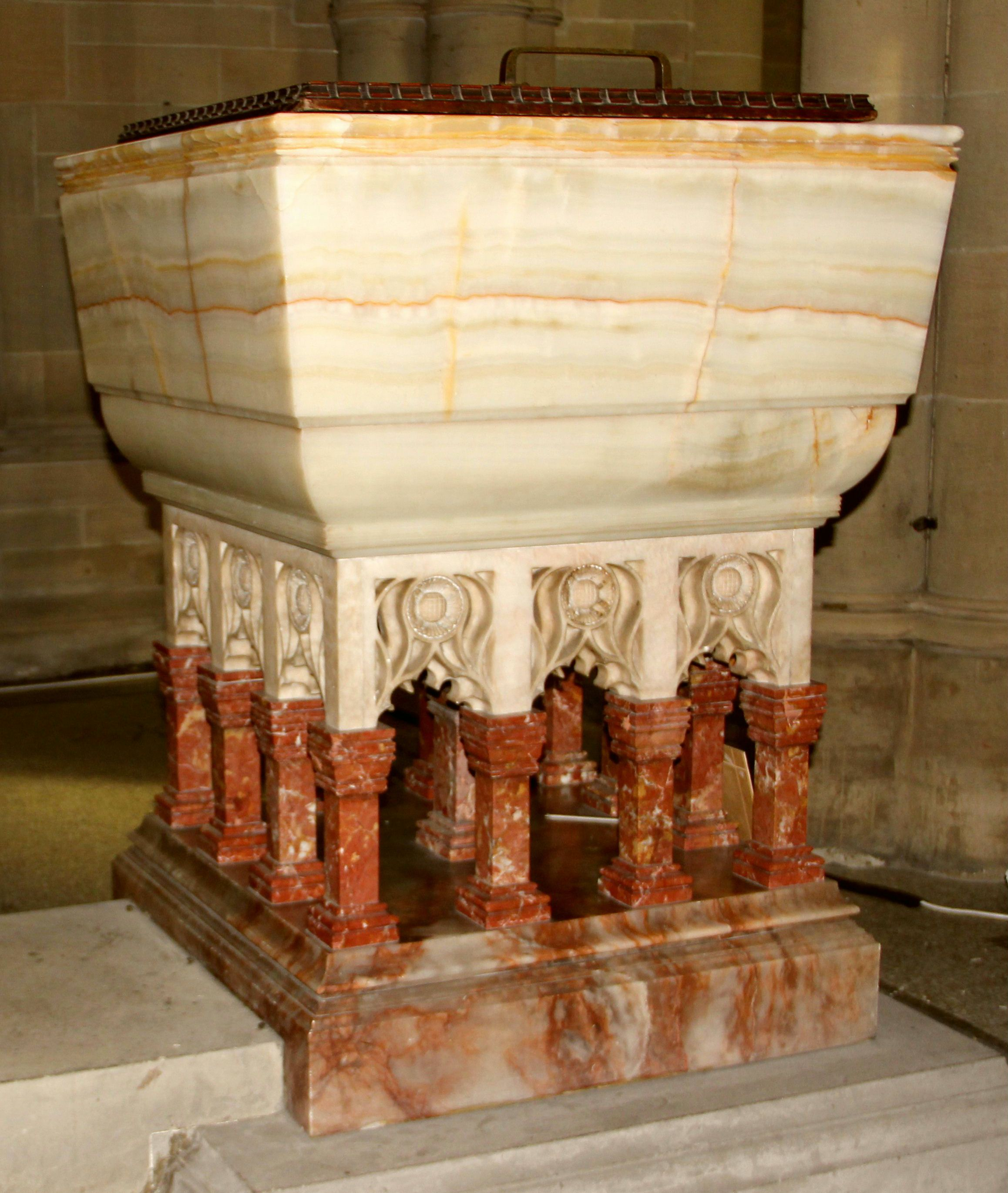
Font, 1888

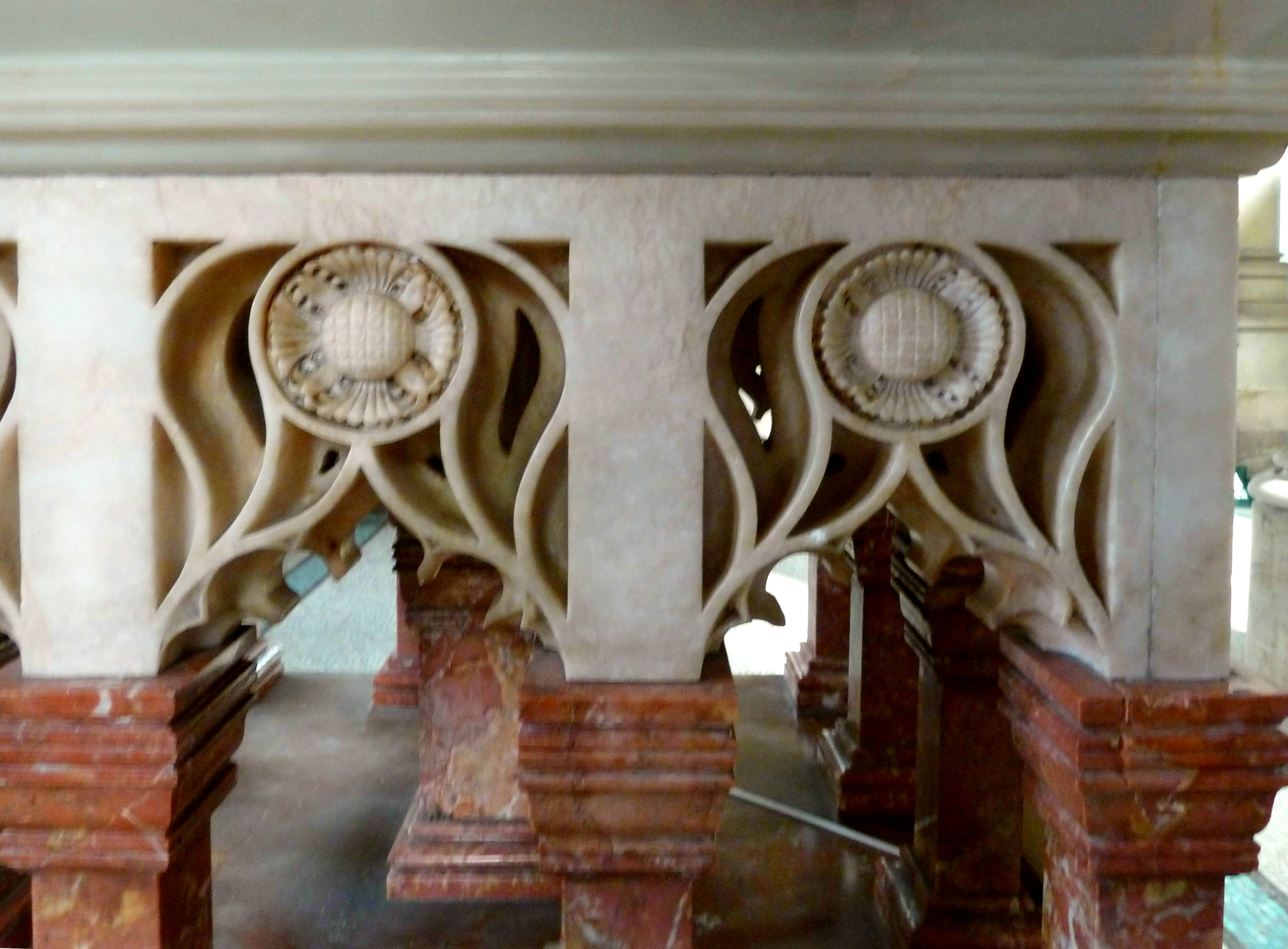
Font, 1888 (detail)

=== Grave monument, Birtley Churchyard, 1888 ===
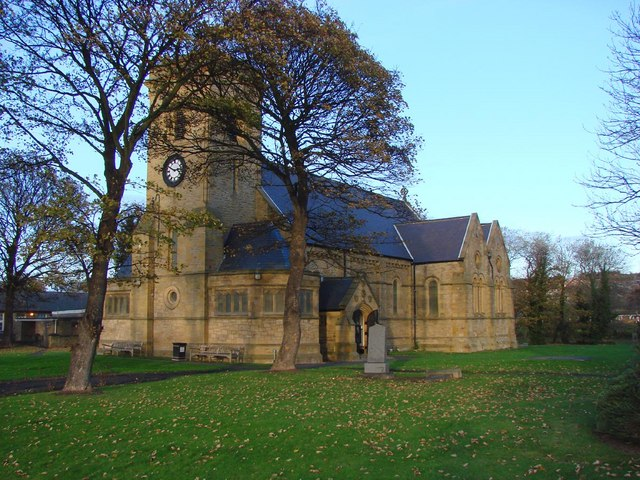
Churchyard of St John, Birtley

In 1888, Robert Beall (as Emley & Co) erected a "neat grey granite monument, all polished, standing 9 feet high". The memorial in the churchyard of St John the Evangelist Church, Birtley, Tyne and Wear, was for John Hobson, who died on 23 March 1887, and had been foreman fitter for forty years at Birtley Iron Company.

== Legacy ==
After Beall died in 1892, his company continued until at least the 1930s. The workshop was inherited by Beall's son Robert Eusebius Beall, who continued to work under the name of Robert Beall until 1909. The business became a limited company in 1933.

Under Robert Eusebius Beall, the company reconstructed the Acca’s Cross in St. Andrew’s cemetery in Hexham and, in 1896, repaired the Grace Darling memorial in Bamburgh. The following war memorials, some including carvings by other sculptors, were erected by Beall's around 1903 and 1920–1921. (Note: After Robert Eusebius Beall died in 1909, the newspapers ceased to report the existence of a dedicated sculptor at the Robert Beall firm of monumental masons.)

An 1899–1902 Second Boer War monument was erected in St Mary's Cathedral, Newcastle upon Tyne. A portion of this memorial is in Fenham Barracks, Newcastle. There are several First World War monuments by Beall's. One was previously at St Aidan's Church (now demolished), Elswick, Newcastle upon Tyne. It was a street shrine on St Oswald's Mission in Mill Lane. It was possibly moved to St John's Cemetery, Elswick. Another such memorial is at St George's churchyard, Cullercoats, Northumberland, and another was at Fatfield, Sunderland, but is now in Bonemill Lane, Washington, Tyne and Wear, and is a listed building. There is a First World War plaque war memorial for church and school at Whitehall Road United Methodist Church, Gateshead, and an outdoor memorial at Jarrow Cemetery. There is also a 1914–1918 monument to members, at the Newcastle Commercial Exchange, Newcastle. The building has since been rebuilt and repurposed. (Note: The Newcastle Commercial Exchange (built 1837) was rebuilt in 1906 and repurposed since then, so it may no longer contain the war memorial. There is a picture of the Exchange here) The Newcastle Commercial Exchange memorial may have been demolished while the bronze panel was retained. Another outdoor First World War memorial is in St Anthony of Egypt churchyard at Walker, Newcastle. Some of Beall's memorials were adapted for both the First World War and the Second World War. These are at Castle Eden, County Durham, at Corbridge Cemetery, Northumberland, at Haltwhistle, Northumberland, and in St Mary the Virgin churchyard, at Ovingham, Northumberland.

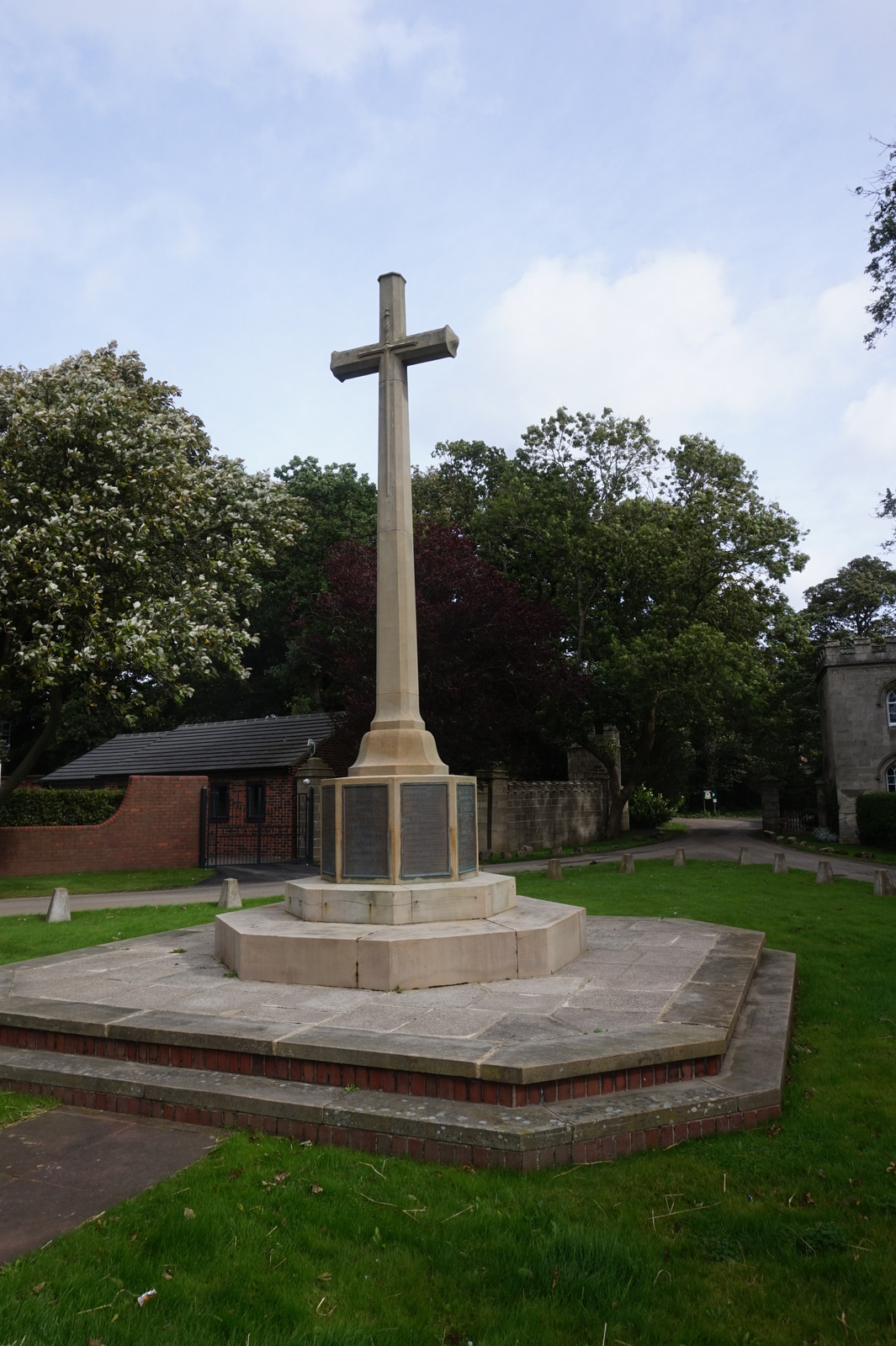
Castle Eden war memorial

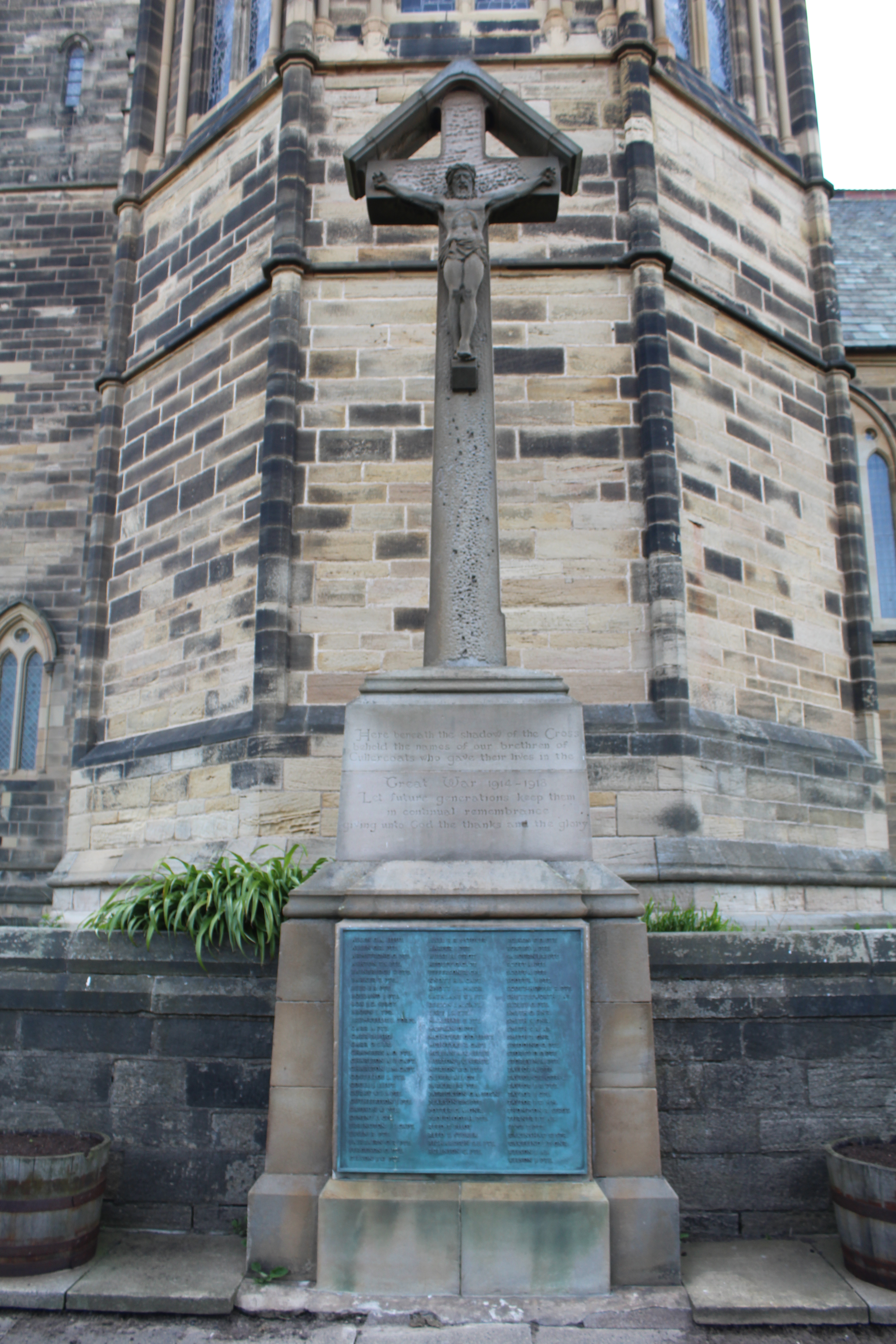
Cullercoats war memorial

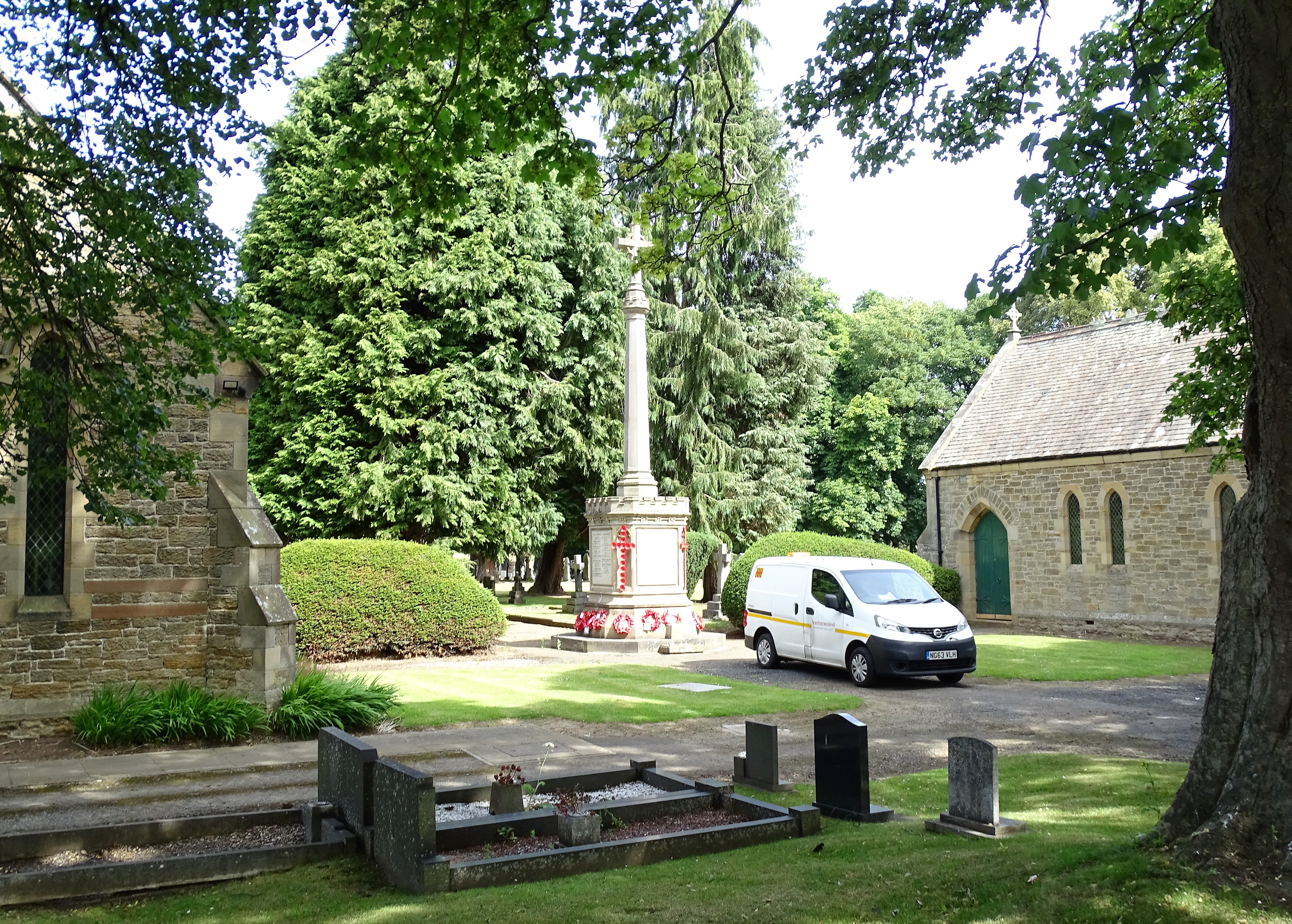
Corbridge war memorial

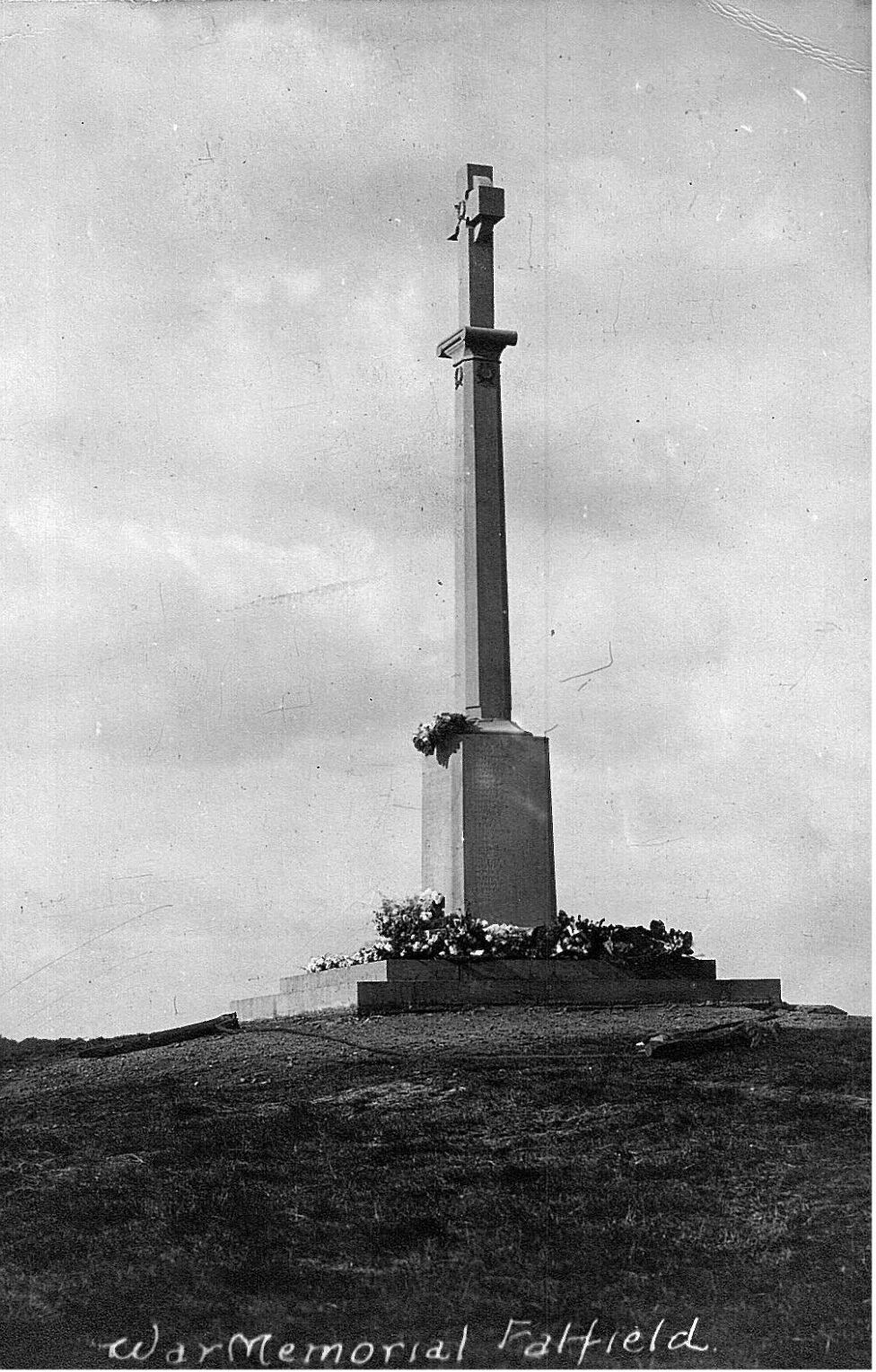
Fatfield war memorial

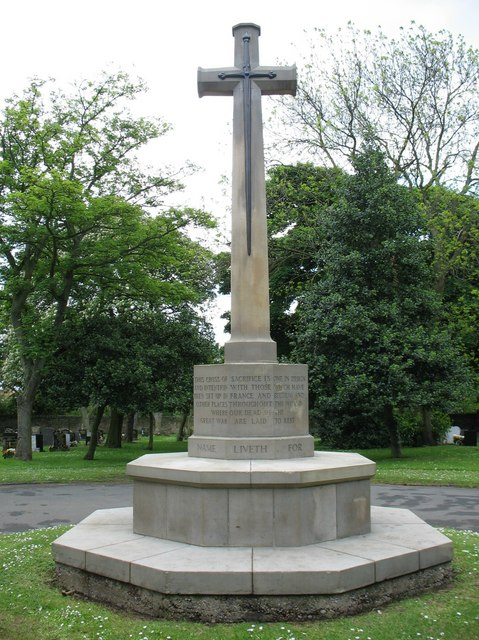
Jarrow Cemetery war memroal

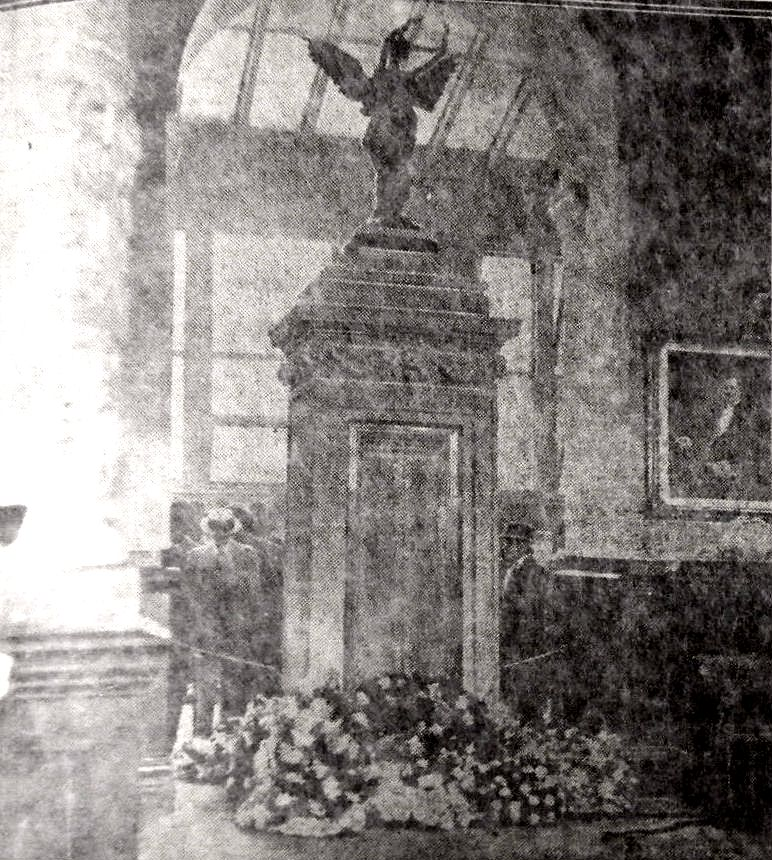
Newcastle Commercial Exchange war memorial (demolished)
