= Faculty of Philosophy, University of Cambridge =

Department of the University of Cambridge

Coordinates: 52.2011°N 0.1096°E

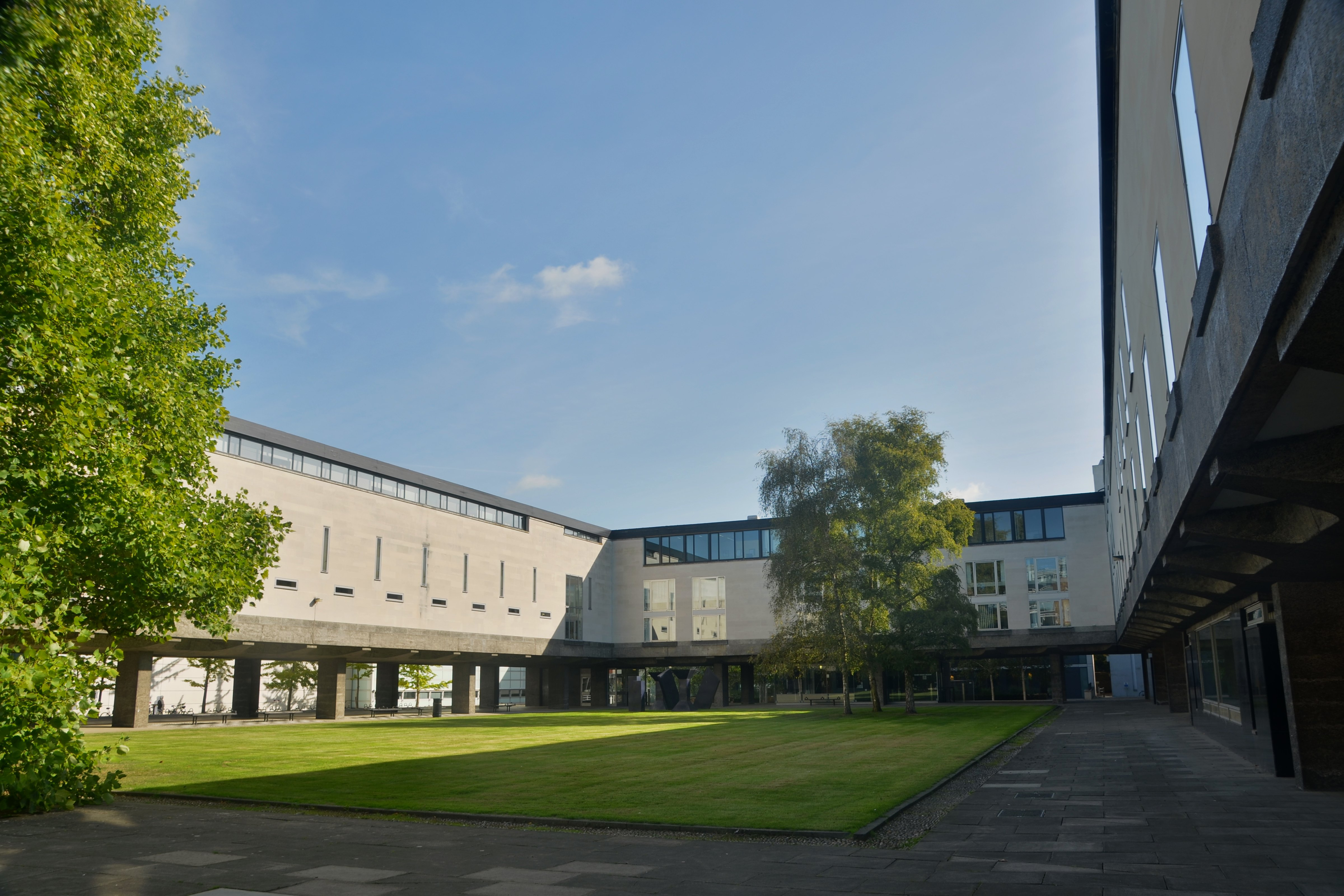
The Raised Faculty Building, where the Faculty of Philosophy is located.

The University of Cambridge was the birthplace of the 'Analytic' School of Philosophy in the early 20th century. The department is located in the Raised Faculty Building on the Sidgwick Site and is part of the Cambridge School of Arts and Humanities. The Faculty achieved the best possible results from The Times 2004 and the QAA Subject Review 2001 (24/24). In the UK as of 2020, it is ranked second by the Guardian, second by the Philosophical Gourmet Report, and fifth by the QS World University Rankings.

== Moral Sciences at Cambridge ==
In 1848 under the direction of William Whewell, two new honour examinations, one in natural sciences (relating to physical science), the other in moral sciences (in the sense of mores or social sciences) were introduced. Moral Sciences was interdisciplinary and included five subjects: moral philosophy, political economy, modern history, general jurisprudence and the laws of England. Moral Sciences was not popular as it did not lead to a degree, and in 1860 no candidates took the examinations.

In 1861 following recommendations made by John Grote and Joseph Mayor, the Senate upgraded the status of Moral Sciences to become a three-year Undergraduate honours course in its own right. The Board of Moral Sciences Studies (a precursor to the Faculty) was also set up. Law became a separate subject and was replaced on the Moral Sciences Tripos by Mental philosophy (psychology).

In 1867 the Board of Moral Sciences Studies recommended that History should also be omitted from the tripos. This was passed by the Council of the Senate, leaving four subjects: moral philosophy, logic, economics and psychology. At this time, J.N. Keynes and James Ward graduated with honours in Moral Sciences and its reputation grew. The increase in quality and to a lesser extent, in quantity, was assisted by the expansion of the teaching staff assisting the two Moral Sciences professors (Political Economy and Moral Philosophy). From the late 1860s a number of College lecturers in the Moral Sciences were appointed from St. John's, Trinity, Caius, and St. Catharine's who included Henry Sidgwick, Joseph Mayor, John Venn, Thomas Woodhouse Levin, and Alfred Marshall.

Constance Maynard was the first woman to read Moral Sciences at Cambridge, completing her studies in 1875.

Due to the efforts of Alfred Marshall, Economics was also dropped from the Moral Sciences Tripos, becoming a separate subject in 1903. This left a syllabus of analytic philosophy. Although Psychology remained nominally part of the Moral Sciences Tripos until after the Second World War, in practice it was an increasingly separate subject in the early part of the twentieth century.

In the first half of the twentieth century Bertrand Russell, G.E. Moore, and Ludwig Wittgenstein were all at work in Cambridge. They were largely responsible for the rise of modern logic and the methods and results of analytic philosophy.

The Moral Sciences Tripos was renamed Philosophy in 1970.

== Philosophers currently at Cambridge ==
The list includes both and also research-active philosophers who play a significant role in the faculty's intellectual life.

- Alexander Bird
- Simon Blackburn (emeritus)
- Angela Breitenbach
- Clare Chambers
- Tim Crane
- Raymond Geuss (emeritus)
- Jane Heal (emeritus)
- Richard Holton
- Rae Langton
- John Marenbon
- Alex Oliver
- Onora O'Neill (emeritus)
- Michael Potter
- Huw Price (emeritus)
- Timothy Smiley (emeritus)

== Past Cambridge philosophers ==
Various philosophers have been Knightbridge Professor of Philosophy. The Knightbridge Chair was founded in 1683 and is one of the oldest established chairs in the university.

Philosophers who either worked or studied in Cambridge—including some Knightbridge Professors—include:

- Desiderius Erasmus
- Francis Bacon
- The Cambridge Platonists, including Ralph Cudworth, Benjamin Whichcote and Henry More
- William Whewell
- John Grote
- Henry Sidgwick
- John Neville Keynes
- George Frederick Stout
- James Ward
- J. M. E. McTaggart
- Bertrand Russell
- William Ritchie Sorley
- G. E. Moore
- Ludwig Wittgenstein
- Alice Ambrose
- Helen Knight
- Margaret MacDonald (philosopher)
- Margaret Masterman
- C. D. Broad
- Richard Braithwaite
- A. C. Ewing
- Frank P. Ramsey
- Georg Henrik von Wright
- Susan Stebbing
- Casimir Lewy
- Jonathan Lear
- Iris Murdoch
- John Wisdom
- Elizabeth Anscombe
- Bernard Williams
- Amartya Sen
- Jonathan Bennett
- Judith Jarvis Thomson
- Ian Hacking
- Roger Scruton
- Kwame Anthony Appiah
- Alain de Botton
- Quassim Cassam
- Alfred North Whitehead
- Renford Bambrough
- Hugh Mellor
- Jimmy Altham
- Eric Olson
- Dominic Scott
- Serena Olsaretti
- Hallvard Lillehammer
- Susan James
- Peter Geach
- William MacAskill
- David Papineau
- A.W. Moore
- Arthur Balfour

== See also ==
- Cambridge University Moral Sciences Club
- Human science
