= Christopher Horsnaile =

Christopher Horsnaile is the name of two British sculptors, who were father and son: Horsnaile the Elder (c. 1658 – 1742) and Horsnaile the Younger (c. 1695 – 1760).

== Horsnaile the Elder ==
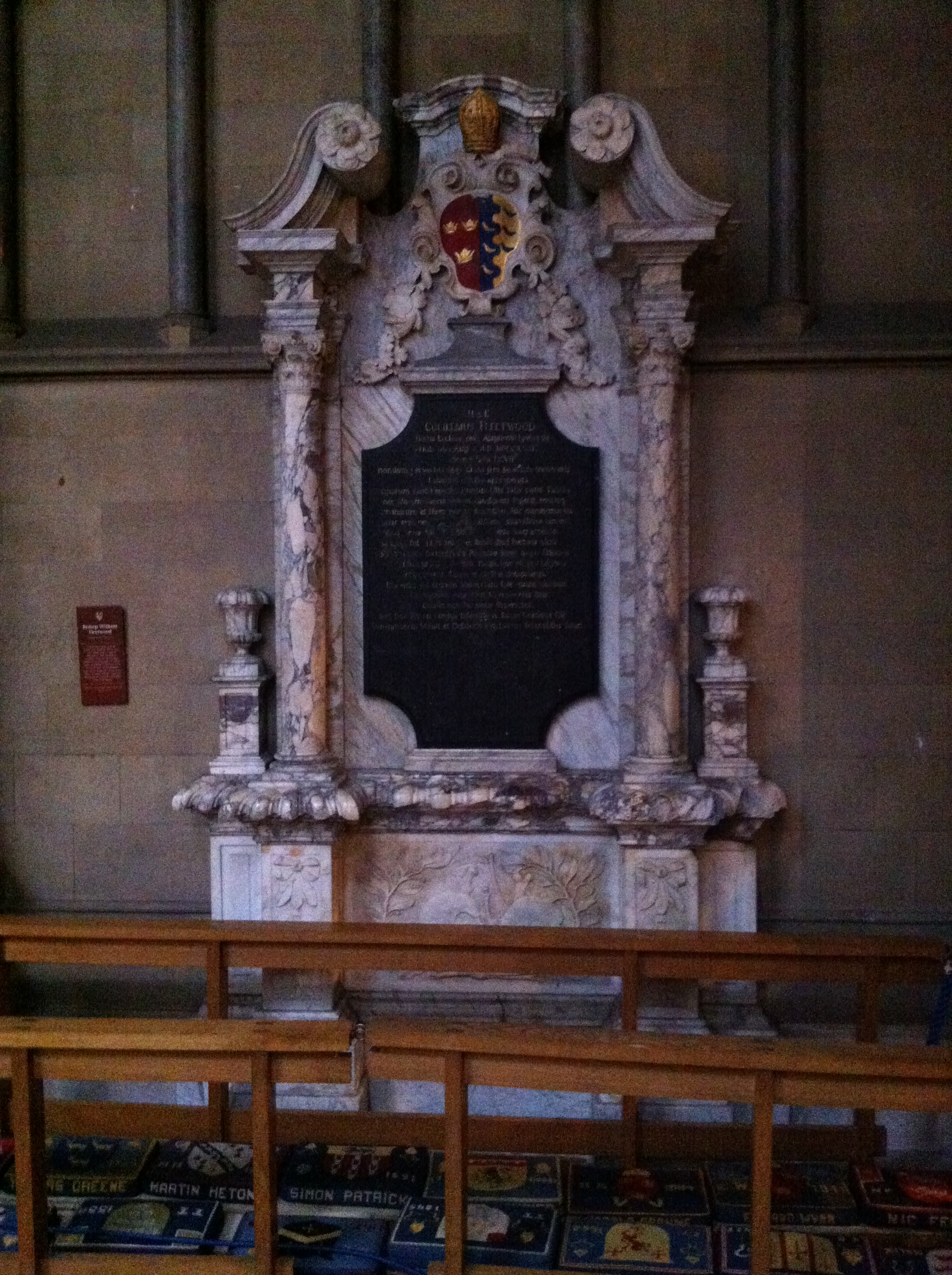
Memorial to Bishop William Fleetwood in Ely Cathedral

He seems to be part of the Horsnaile family from Warfield.

He served his apprenticeship as a stonemason in London and left the Masons Company in 1700 through service with Herbert Paine. He was then living at the Bell (Tavern) in Glasshouse Yard in the Blackfriars district.

From around 1705 he worked in partnership with Edward Stanton and together they worked on Westminster Abbey from 1720 to 1734. After Stanton's death Horsnaile worked on the Abbey alone until 1737.

== Known works ==
- Internal work at Royal College of Physicians in Warwick Lane
- Memorial to Bishop William Fleetwood (1724) in Ely Cathedral
- Fireplaces, door surrounds and statues at Ditchley Park (1725) (with Stanton)
- Hoare's Bank (1726 - 1738)
- Chimneypieces at Lord Folkestone's London House (1727)
- Coat of Arms and dragon heads on the Bishopsgate (1733) heads survive
- Fireplace in dormitory of Westminster School (1733)
- Mason to the Inner Temple (1737 to 1742)
- St Olave's Church, Southwark (1737) with John Deval (now demolished)

== Horsnaile the Younger ==
Probably born around 1695 he was apprenticed to his father on 24 January 1708. He served this apprenticeship with William Stanton son of his father's business partner. They both became Freemen of the Masons Company in January 1719.

He lived in St Andrew's Parish in Holborn, London. From 1734 he served as the City Mason.

In 1749 he moved to Weston House on the Arden estate in Bulkington, the house of Richard Hayward.

He died on 31 January 1760. He left over £10,000 in his will (over £2 million in current terms).

== Known works ==
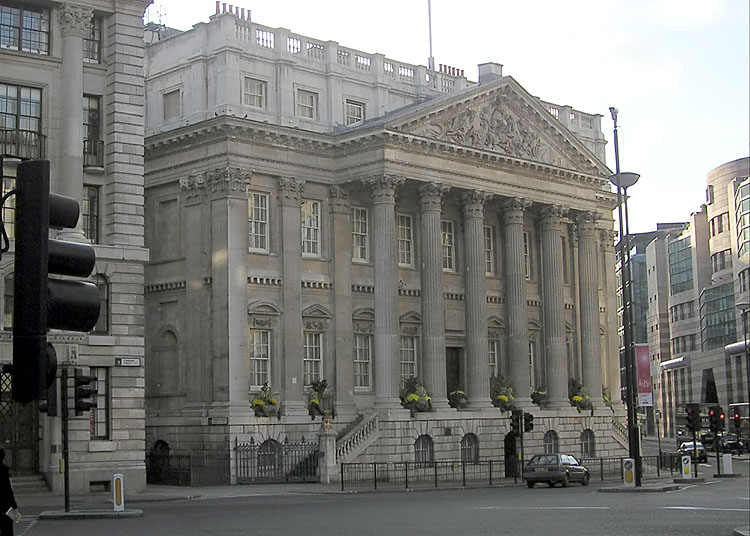
The Mansion House façade

- Mansion House, London (1738 to 1752) both interior including the Egyptian Hall and exterior under George Dance the Elder.
- House in Red Lion Square (1748) for John Nicholl, father of Lady Carnarvon.
- Ornamentation of 4 houses (including the Rainbow Tavern) in Cornhill, London for Earl Cowper (1748)

== Family ==
His wife outlived him.

He had a daughter Ann and son Christopher.
