= Ben Colburn =

British philosopher

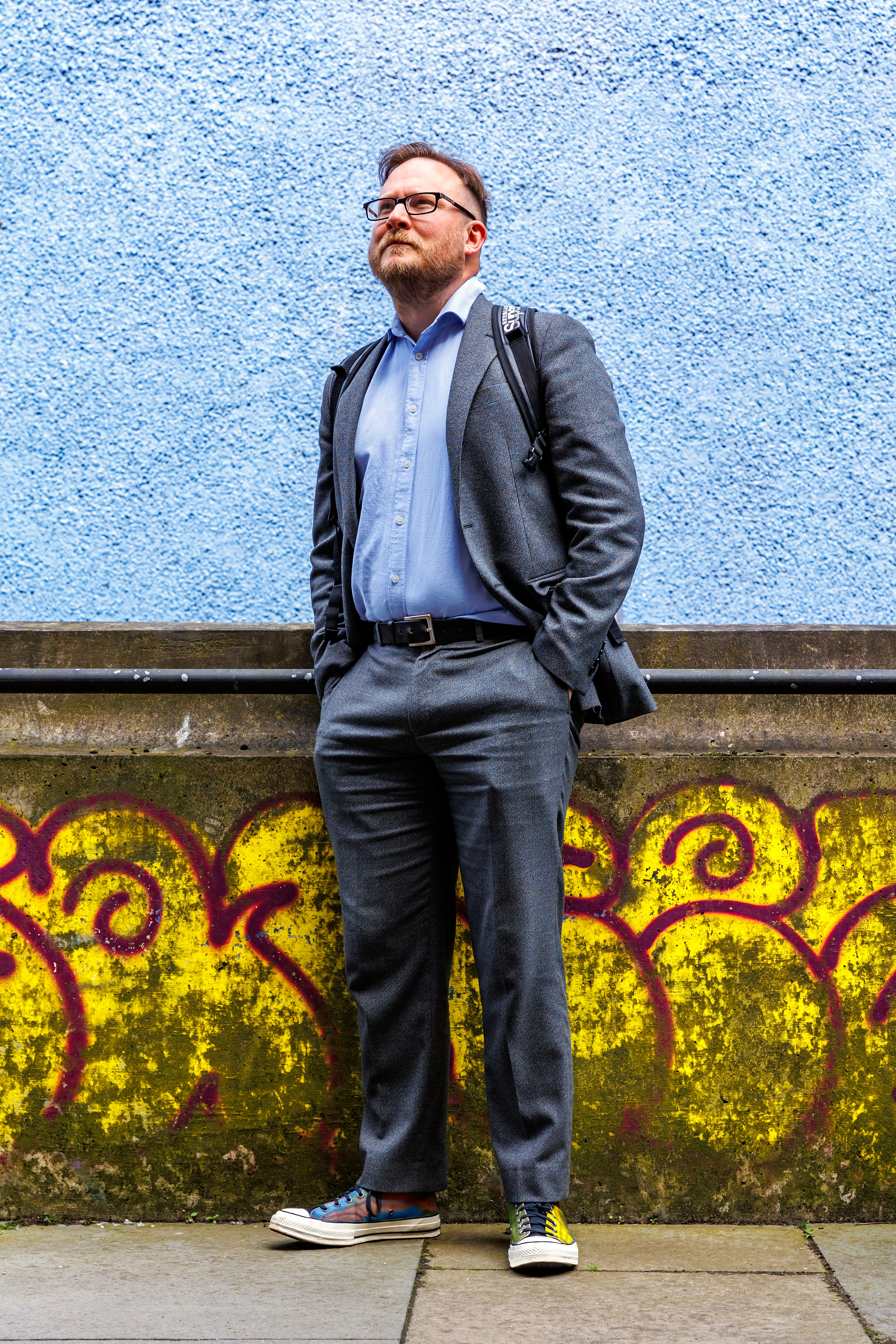
- Born: 1982 (age 43–44)

Education
- Education: University of Cambridge (PhD, 2008)
- Doctoral advisors: Hallvard Lillehammer; Serena Olsaretti
- Other advisor: D. H. Mellor

Philosophical work
- Era: 21st-century philosophy
- Region: Western philosophy
- School: Analytic
- Institutions: University of Glasgow
- Main interests: Political philosophy, ethics, liberalism, autonomy

Ben Colburn (born 1982) is a British philosopher who is Professor of Political Philosophy at the University of Glasgow. He is known for his work on political philosophy and ethics, with a particular interest in autonomy.

== Books ==
- Moral Blackmail: Coercion, Responsibility, and Global Justice. Series: Routledge focus on philosophy. Routledge: Abingdon, Oxfordshire; New York, NY. 2024. ISBN 978-1-032-19525-4
- Autonomy and Liberalism. Series: Routledge studies in contemporary philosophy, 19. Routledge. 2010. ISBN 978-0-415-87596-7
