= Thomas Hill (sculptor) =

English sculptor

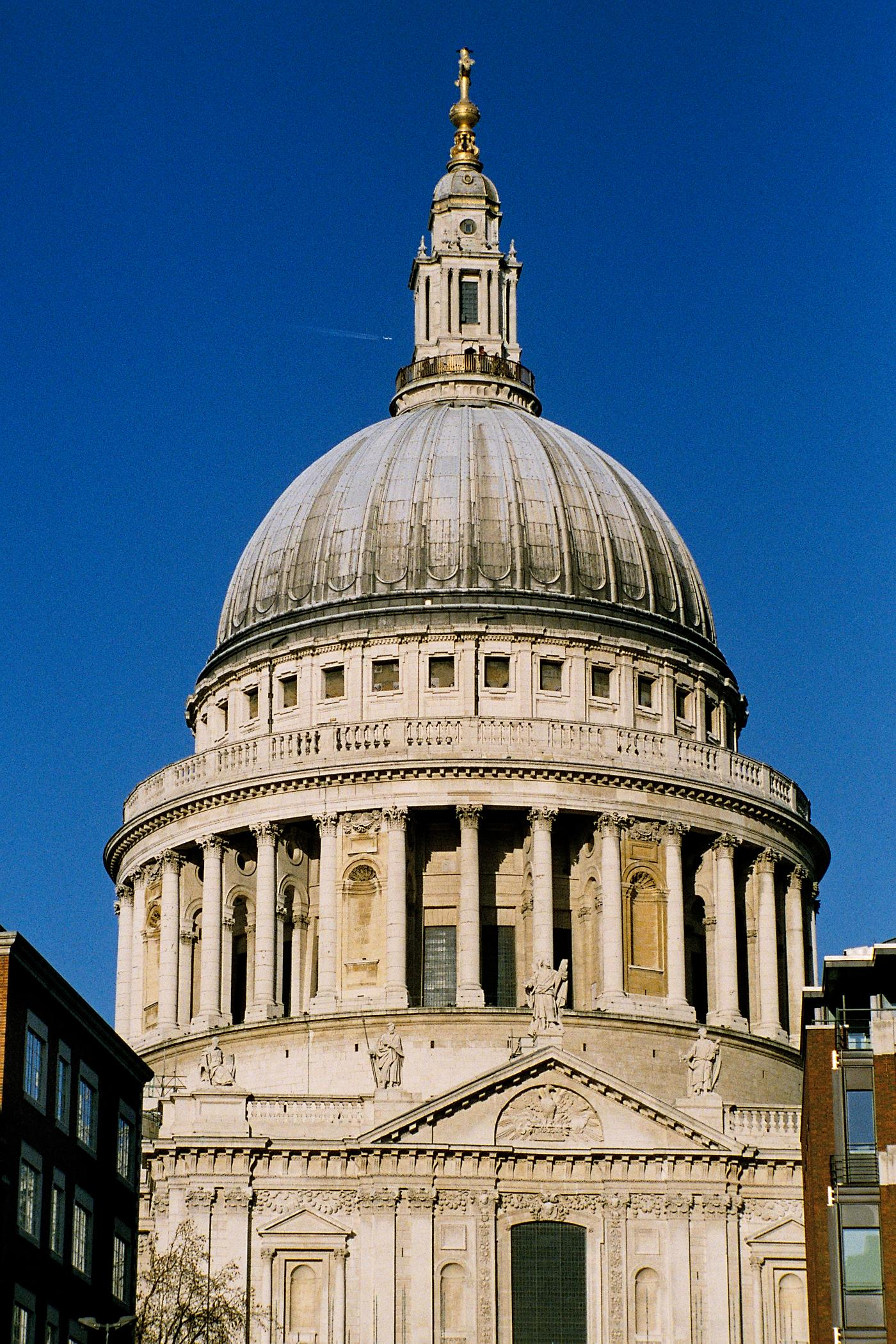
Dome of St Paul's Cathedral

Thomas Hill (c.1645–1713) was a 17th/18th century English sculptor, based in London.

== Life ==
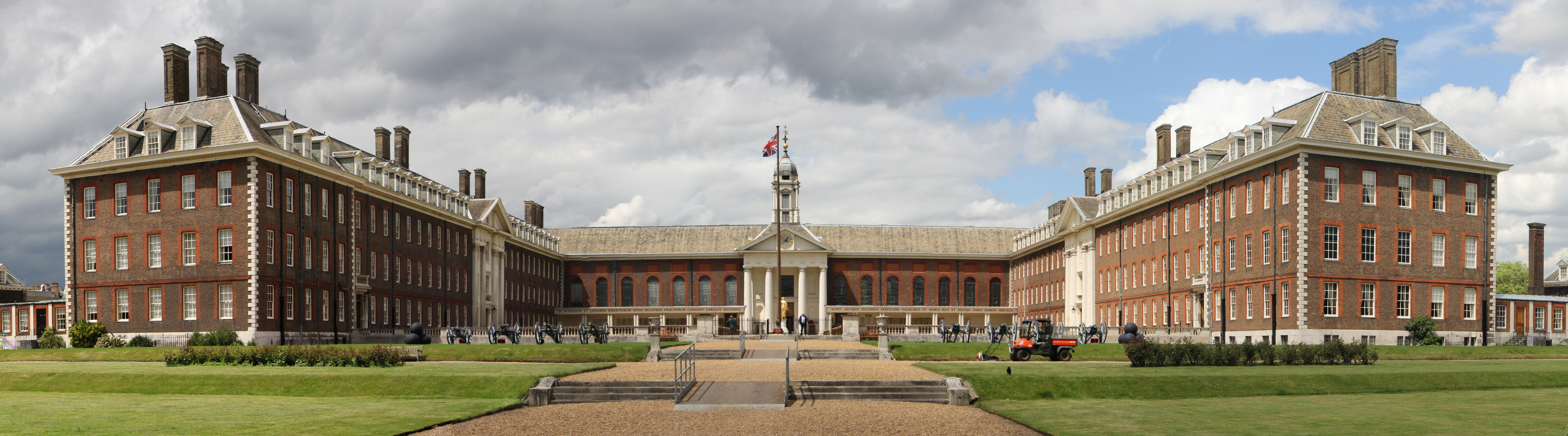
Royal Hospital Chelsea

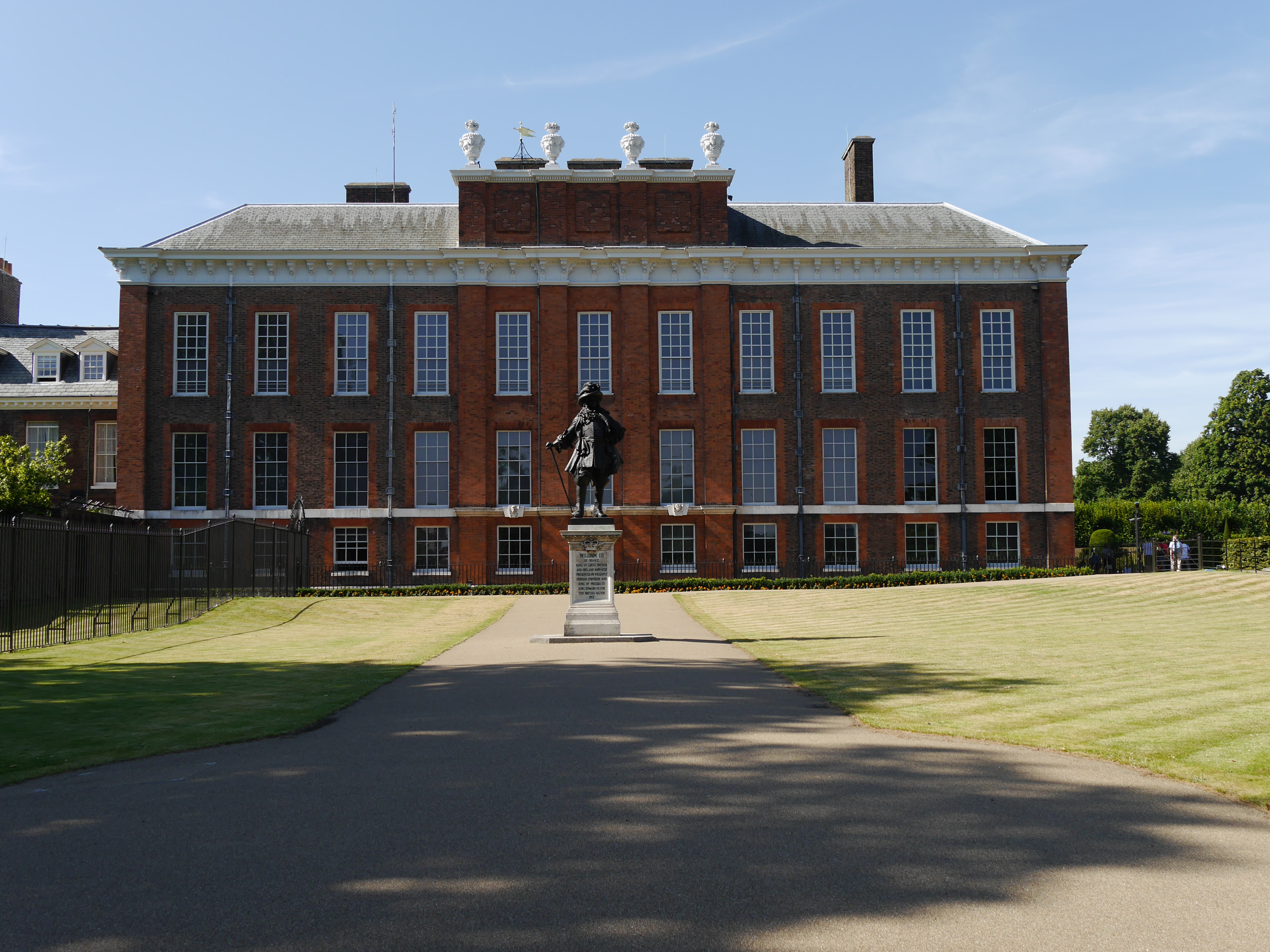
Kensington Palace

He was born in London around 1645. As a journeyman mason following the Great Fire of London in 1666 he was most certainly involved in many rebuilding projects. In 1670 he became a Freeman of the Worshipful Company of Masons. In that guild he became "Renter Warden" in 1694 and "Upper Warden" in 1695, finally becoming Master of the Company in 1699. In 1708 he is listed as operating from Chelsea, London.

Many of his major projects were in partnership with Thomas Wise. According to Christopher Wren, who he worked with constantly, he "consulted the stars" before every project.

He appears to retire around 1705 and died in London in 1713.

== Works ==
As Master of the Mason's Company in this major rebuilding period Hill is listed as being involved in several major projects:

- Font in Church of St Anne and St Agnes (1681)
- Duchess Mazarin's quarters and six other rooms at Whitehall Palace (1685/6)
- Ormonde House at Chelsea Royal Hospital (1689-90)
- Dome of St Paul's Cathedral (1686-1707)
- External work and all chimneypieces in Kensington Palace (1689-90)
- Queen Mary's bedroom at Whitehall Palace (1693)
- Greenwich Palace (1698)
- Memorial to William Levinz in St John's College, Oxford (1698)
- Ornamental lions at the Tower of London (1701)
- Hampton Court (1699)
- Monument to Mrs Frances Ball at Hampton, Middlesex (1704)
- Monument to Mr Jordan an Barbados Cathedral (1706)

== Family ==
His son "Thomas Hill the Younger" (d.1724) was apprenticed to him then worked under William Stanton.
