= Kati Farkas =

Kati Farkas may refer to:

- Katalin Farkas, Hungarian philosopher
- Kati Farkas, a recurring character from American teen drama TV series Gossip Girl
