= Alfred Williams Momerie =

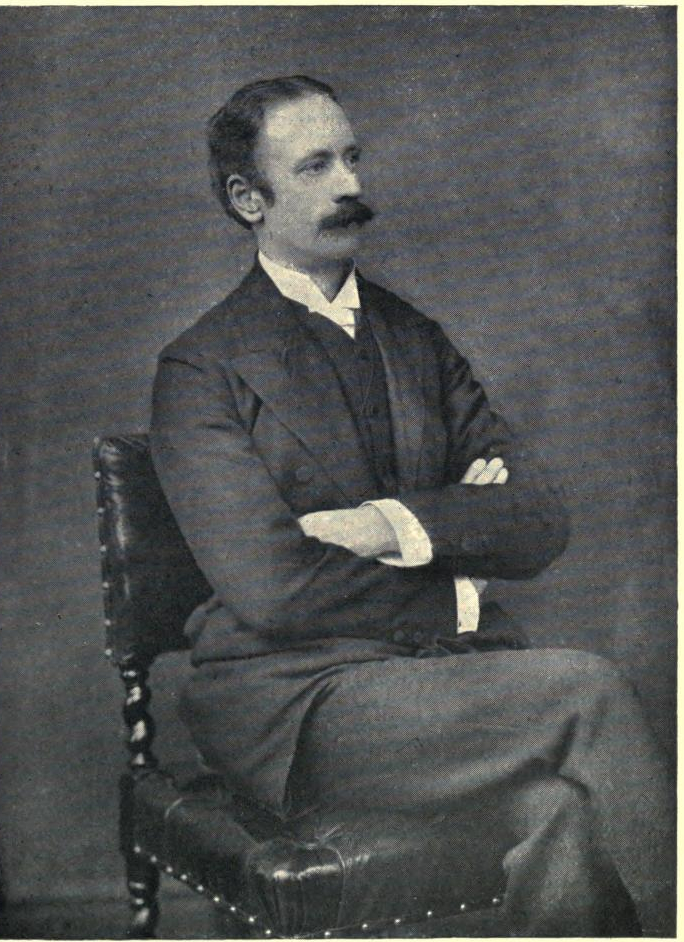

Alfred Williams Momerie (1848–1900) was an English cleric and academic of Broad Church views.

== Life ==
Born in London on 22 March 1848, he was the only child of Isaac Vale Mummery (1812–1892), a Congregational minister, and his wife, a daughter of Thomas George Williams of Hackney; he used the form Momerie of the Huguenot name Mummery from 1879. He was educated at the City of London School and Edinburgh University, where he won the Horsliehill and Miller scholarship with the medal and Bruce prize for metaphysics, and graduated M.A. in 1875 and D.Sc. in 1876. From Edinburgh he went on to St. John's College, Cambridge, where he was admitted on 17 March 1875 and was senior in the Moral Sciences Tripos in 1877, graduating B.A. in 1878 and M.A. in 1881. He was ordained deacon in 1878, and priest in 1879, as curate of Leigh, Lancashire.

On 5 November 1879 Momerie was elected fellow of St John's College, and in 1880 he was appointed professor of logic and mental philosophy at King's College, London. In 1883 he was chosen morning preacher at the Foundling Hospital.

Between 1881 and 1890 Momerie published on the philosophy of Christianity, and enjoyed a vogue. As had happened to his predecessor Frederick Denison Maurice, Momerie then found himself obliged to sever his connection with King's College, leaving in 1891. In the same year he resigned the Foundling preachership also. With the permission of the Bishop of London he subsequently preached on Sundays at the Portman rooms.

In 1893 he attended and spoke at the World's Parliament of Religions in Chicago, USA.

Momerie died in London on 6 December 1900, at 14 Chilworth Street. In 1887 he had received the honorary degree of LL.D. from Edinburgh University.

== Works ==
Momerie's major works were:

- Personality the Beginning and End of Metaphysics, London, 1879; 4th edit. 1889.
- The Origin of Evil, and other Sermons, London, 1881; 6th edit. Edinburgh, 1890.
- Defects of Modern Christianity, and other Sermons, Edinburgh, 1882; 2nd edit. 1885.
- The Basis of Religion, Edinburgh, 1883 2nd edit. 1886. This work was critical of John Robert Seeley's Natural Religion.
- Agnosticism and other Sermons, Edinburgh, 1884; 2nd edit, 1887.
- Preaching and Hearing, and other Sermons, Edinburgh, 1886; 3rd edit. 1890.
- Inspiration and other Sermons, Edinburgh, 1889; 2nd edit. 1890.
- Church and Creed: Sermons preached in the Chapel of the Foundling Hospital, London, 1890.
- The Religion of the Future, and other Essays, Edinburgh, 1893.
- The English Church and the Romish Schism, 2nd edit. Edinburgh, 1896.

== Family ==
In 1896 Momerie married Ada Louisa, the widow of Charles E. Herne.
