= Edward Stanton (sculptor) =

English stonemason, builder and sculptor

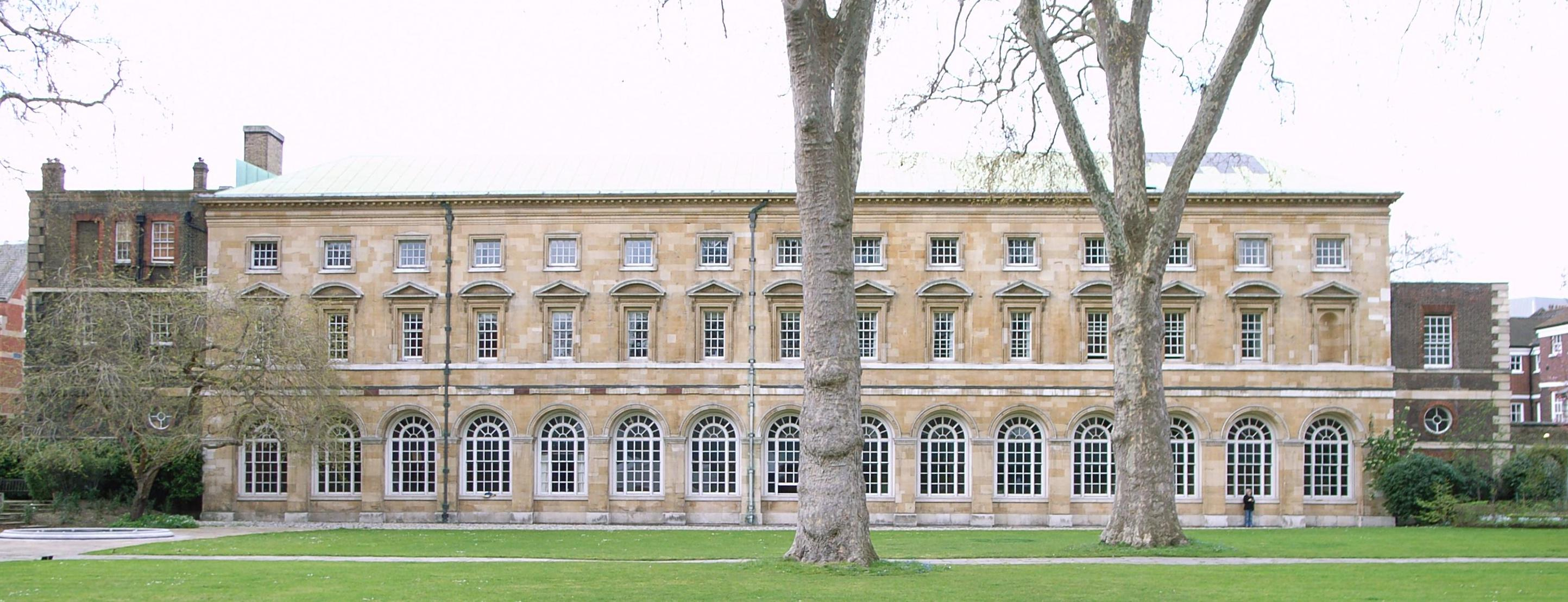
Westminster School dormitory by Stanton

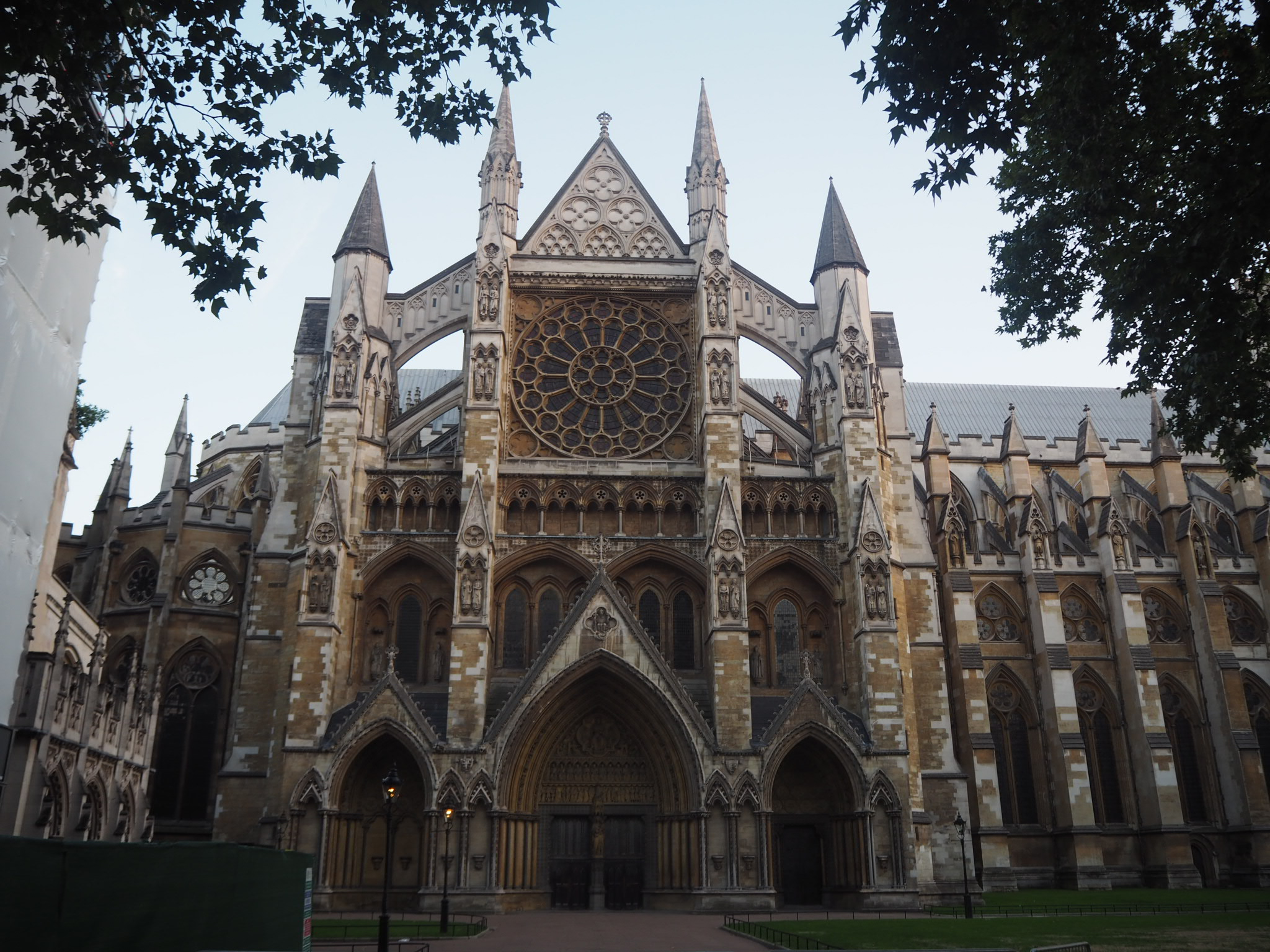
North side of Westminster Abbey by Stanton

Edward Stanton (1681–1734) was an English stonemason, builder and sculptor.

== Life ==
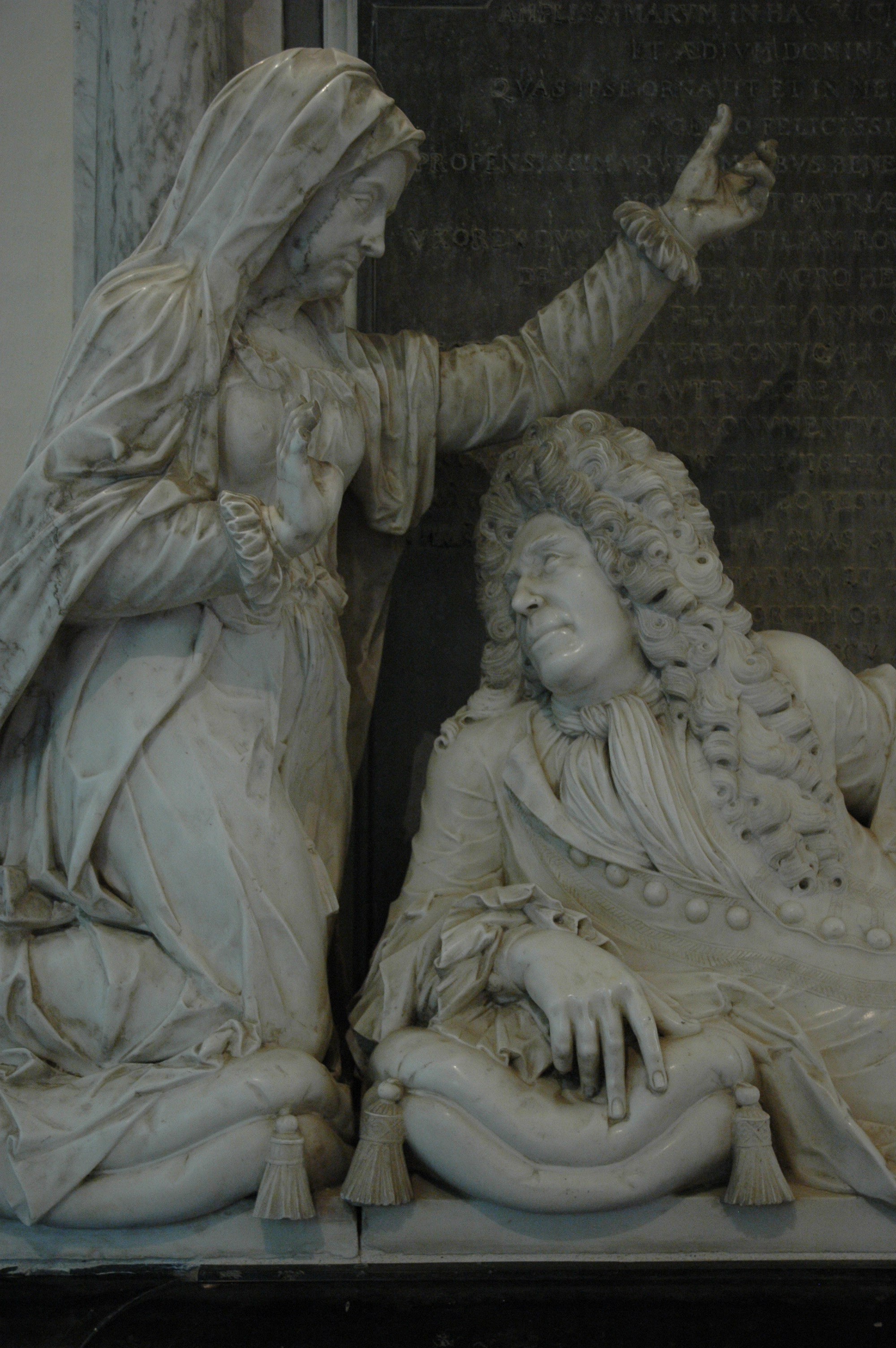
Memorial to Sir Francis Russell, Strensham Church (detail)

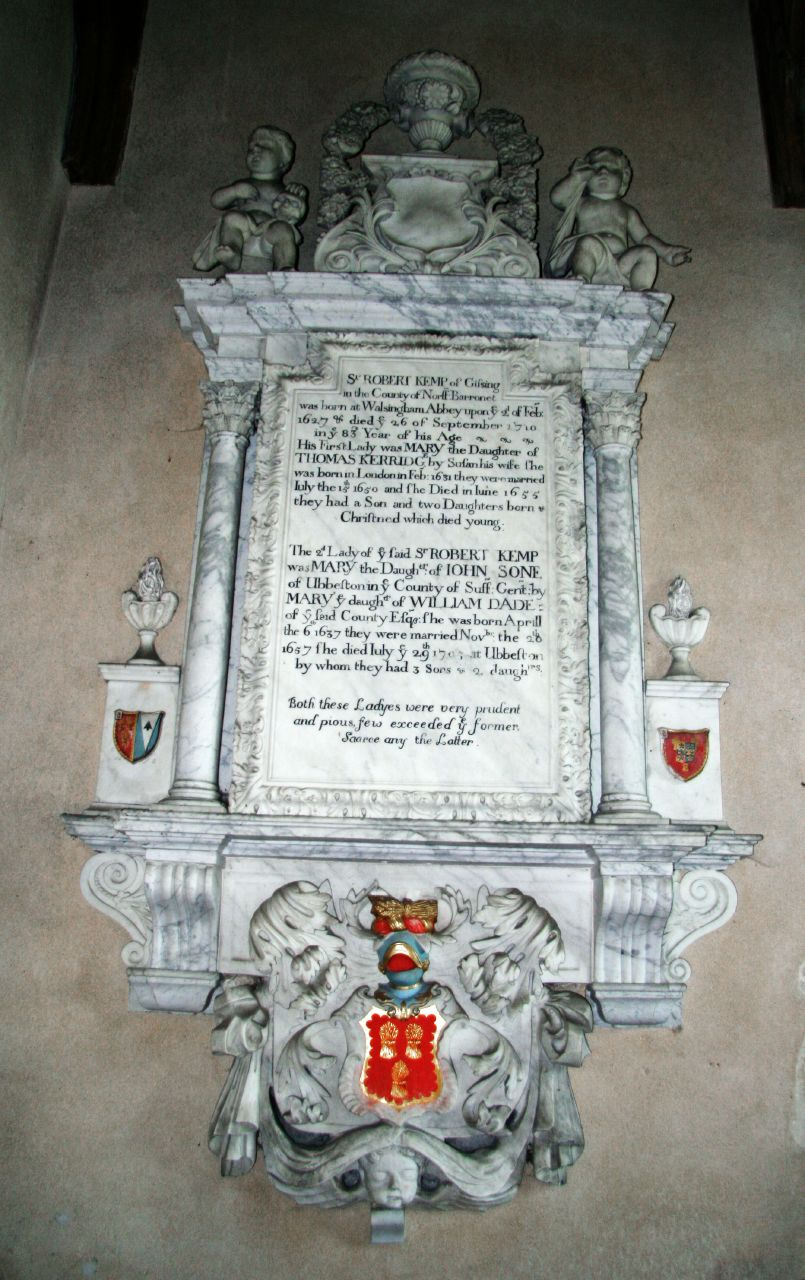
Monument to Sir robert Kemp in St Mary's church Gissing

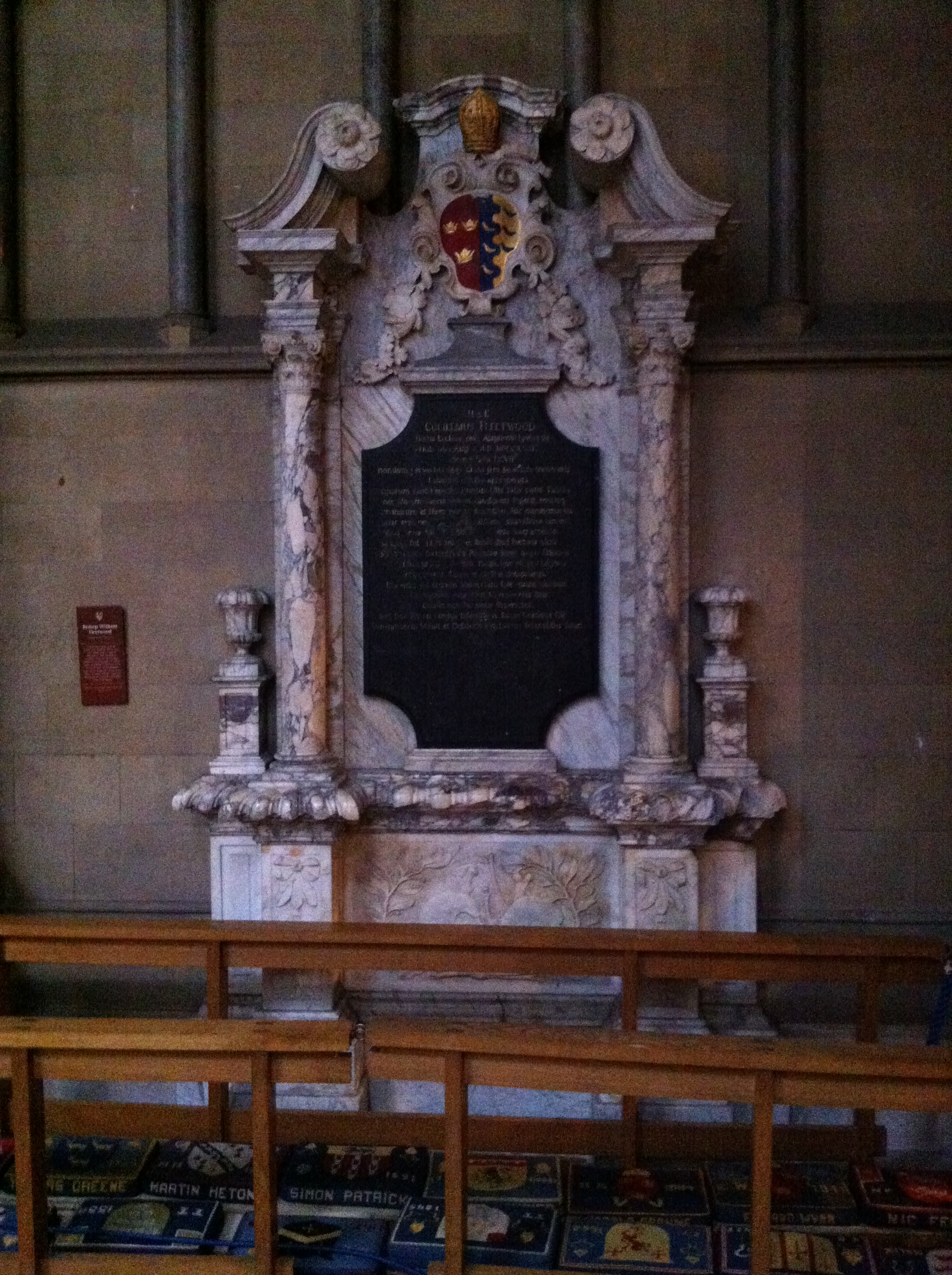
Memorial to Bishop William Fleetwood in Ely Cathedral

He was the son of William Stanton, mason (1639–1705) and was apprenticed to his father, along with his brother, Thomas Stanton, and admitted a member of the Worshipful Company of Masons of the City of London in 1702. His first recorded work is a monument at Mitton in Yorkshire to Richard and Isabel Shireburn, 1699, and he is known to have carved over 40 monuments between then and 1718, as well as chimneypieces (for example at Aynhoe Park, Northamptonshire) and Knowsley Hall, Lancashire. In 1720, Stanton was appointed Mason to Westminster Abbey, a post he held until his death, and in which his chief work was rebuilding the north front of the church.

He was in partnership with sculptor Christopher Horsnaile for a large part of his career.

Stanton served as Warden of the Masons' Company in 1713 and 1716, and as Master in 1719. From 1720 onwards he abandoned memorials and worked exclusively on Westminster Abbey (this is likely to have been a contractual obligation).

He died in 1734, and was buried near his parents at St. Andrew, Holborn in the city of London.

== Family ==
He married three times, firstly to a daughter of Samuel Fulkes, his third wife being the daughter of Robert Churchill, mason and bricklayer.

His son Edward Stanton was a linen draper in Fleet Street "at the Golden Key".

== Works ==
- Tomb of Richard Shireburn and his wife at Great Mitton, (1699)
- Monument to Mary Chester at Barkway (1703) completing his father's work
- Tomb of Sir Anthony Abdy at Kelvedon (1704)
- Tomb of Ann Barnham at Warminghurst (1704)
- Fireplaces for Aynhoe Park (1704 to 1707)
- Tomb of Sir Francis Russell, 2nd Baronet of Wytley in Strensham (1705)
- Monument to Thomas Bromsal at Blunham (1705)
- Monument to John Hutchinson at Lichfield Cathedral (1705)
- Memorial to Sir William Lytton at Knebworth (1705)
- Memorial to Lady Wagstaffe at Bishops Tachbrook near Warwick (1706)
- Monument to Jane Pye at Faringdon (1706)
- Monument to Henry Chauncey at Ardeley (1706)
- Monument to William Bury at Grantham (1706)
- Ornamentation in Temple Church, London (1707)
- Monument to Sir Thomas Brograve at Braughing (1707)
- Memorial to Sir Philip Monoux at Wootton, Bedfordshire (1707)
- Memorial to Sir George Strode at Knebworth (1707)
- Memorial to Sir William Craven at Winwick, Northamptonshire (1707)
- Memorial to James Sidgrave in Charterhouse School Chapel (1707)
- Monument to William Fisher at Chawton
- Monument to Rev Thomas Smoult at Barkway
- Memorial to Bishop Simon Patrick in Ely Cathedral (1707)
- Memorial to Sir Thomas Wagstaffe at Bishops Tachbrook (1708)
- Monument to Edward Tyson at All Hallows Church in Twickenham (1708)
- Memorial to Sir John Burgoyne in Sutton, Bedfordshire (1709)
- Ornamentation of staircase at Stoneyhurst Hall for Sir Nicholas Shireburn (1709)
- Monument to Lady Smith in Edmondthorpe (1710)
- Memorial to the Buckeridge family in West Ham Parish Church (1710)
- Monument to John Sneyd in Keel, Staffordshire (1710)
- Monument to Nathaniel Fowler in Southill, Bedfordshire (1710)
- Memorial to Sir Robert Kemp, 2nd Baronet at Gissing (1710)
- Memorial to Sir Edward Smyth at Theydon Mount (1710)
- Monument to George Vernon at Sudbury, Derbyshire (1710)
- Monument to Thomas Rayner at Dallington, Northamptonshire (1710)
- Monument to Sibill Brown at Greenford, Middlesex (1711)
- Monument to Ralph Bromsal at Blunham (1711)
- Decorations and the Three Crane Staircase at the Guildhall, London (1711)
- Monument to Thomas Swallow at Thaxted (1712)
- Memorial to Sir Salathiel Lovell at Harlestone (1713)
- Monument to Lady Isham at Lamport, Northamptonshire (1713)
- Monument to Felix Calvert at Hunsdon (1713)
- Monument to Isaac Milner at St Mary-at-Hill (1713)
- Monument to Henry Cooley at Ivinghoe (1714)
- Memorial to Elizabeth Manningham in Chichester Cathedral (1714)
- Monument to Thomas Orme at Longdon, Staffordshire (1716)
- Memorial to Lady Lovell at Harlestone (1718)
- North front of Westminster Abbey (1720 to 1734) - note, this is the most public face
- Decoration at Leicester House in London (1721)
- Fireplace for Knowsley Hall in Lancashire (1724)
- New dormitory at Westminster School (1726 to 1730)
- Monument to Bishop Fleetwood of Ely (d..1723) in north chancel aisle of Ely Cathedral (with C. Horsnaile).
- Monument to Sir Marmaduke Dayrell and his mother
