= John Colbatch =

English churchman and academic

John Colbatch (1664–11 February 1748), sometimes Colbach, was an English churchman and academic, professor of moral philosophy at Cambridge. Drawn into the long legal struggle between Richard Bentley and the fellowship of Trinity College, Cambridge, he became a chief opponent and spent a short time in prison for a tactless court appearance.

== Early life and career ==
Colbatch was the son of John Colbatch of Ludlow, Shropshire. He was educated at St. Peter's, Westminster, and was admitted as a scholar in 1680. He then proceeded to Trinity College, Cambridge, in 1683. He became Fellow of his college, proceeding B.A. in 1686. On first taking orders he was appointed chaplain to the British factory at Lisbon, where he remained around seven years, and wrote, at the request of Gilbert Burnet, an Account of the State of Religion and Literature in Portugal for which he received promises of preferment from the bishop and from Queen Mary. He returned to England to prepare for Trinity College Gilbert Burnet the younger, the bishop's second son, and in 1701, by the good offices of Bentley, was selected by the Charles Seymour, 6th Duke of Somerset, chancellor of Cambridge University, as tutor to his eldest son, the Earl of Hertford. After two years at Cambridge Colbatch was persuaded by the duke to travel on the Grand Tour two years more with his pupil, but in the end of the tour the duke suddenly quarrelled with him and dismissed him from his post, allowing him only his bare salary less expenses, and passing harsh reflections on his character. These reflections the duke was persuaded by Bentley to retract, but he did not fulfil promises of preferment.

Burnet's patronage resulted only in a prebend's stall at Salisbury worth £20 yearly, and Colbatch returned to Cambridge at the age of forty disappointed. His university, however, elected him Professor of Casuistical Divinity in 1707, and his lectures on moral philosophy brought him a reputation.

== Feud with Bentley ==
Residence at Cambridge as fellow of Trinity involved him in the feud between the master and fellows of Trinity College. Colbatch at first was a moderate, and published a pamphlet in defence of Bentley's contention that any B.D. or D.D. should, for college rooms or a college living, have priority over a master of arts. After the death of John Moore, bishop of Ely and Visitor, in 1714, he felt it impossible to remain neutral in the quarrel, and his refusal in that year of Bentley's offer of the vice-mastership of the college began his long contest with the master. He took the lead of the fellows in the efforts made to cause William Fleetwood, Moore's successor, to move against Bentley, and in 1716 came to an open rupture with the master, because he refused to accede to his claim to the vice-mastership.

In 1720 there was another public quarrel between them, in which Colbatch had the best of it, and forced Bentley to agree to appointing him to the college living of Orwell, Cambridgeshire, which he held till his death. In 1720 also Bentley published a pamphlet violently abusing Colbatch, to whom he erroneously attributed Conyers Middleton's attack on his proposals for a new edition of the Greek Testament. Colbatch endeavoured to get damages in the courts for this libel. In 1722 he issued a tract entitled Jus Academicum, in which his irritation at the failure to bring Bentley to justice led him to use certain expressions questioning the authority of the court of king's bench over the university. For this Bentley brought an action. Unfortunately for Colbatch the judge imagined that certain barbs intended for Bentley were aspersions on the court of king's bench, and Colbatch, owing partly to his own want of tact at the trial in 1723, was fined £50 and imprisoned for a week.

In 1727 Bentley presented him with the old college clock for his church at Orwell, the one instance of a soothing effort during the quarrel. In 1729 Colbatch published, and in 1732 republished, a tract which finally was entitled A Defence of the Lord Bishop of Ely's Visitatorial Jurisdiction over Trinity College in general, and over the Master thereof in particular.

In 1738 he was prosecuted by Bentley as archdeacon of Ely, because he refused fees due to the archdeacon at his visitation. The archdeacon had ceased to visit, but the fees nevertheless were usually paid. Colbatch was defeated in the courts, but argued for his course of action in a pamphlet entitled The Case of Proxies payable to Ecclesiastical Visitors.

== Death and legacy ==
In 1733 he wrote An Examination of the late Archdeacon Echard's Account of the Marriage Treaty between King Charles II and Queen Catharine, Infanta of Portugal, defending Laurence Echard against Lord Lansdowne's criticisms. He died in Cambridge on 11 February 1748. He left £30 a year to a charity school at Orwell, and was during his lifetime a considerable benefactor to the church.
