= Susan Haack =

English philosopher and academic (1945–2026)

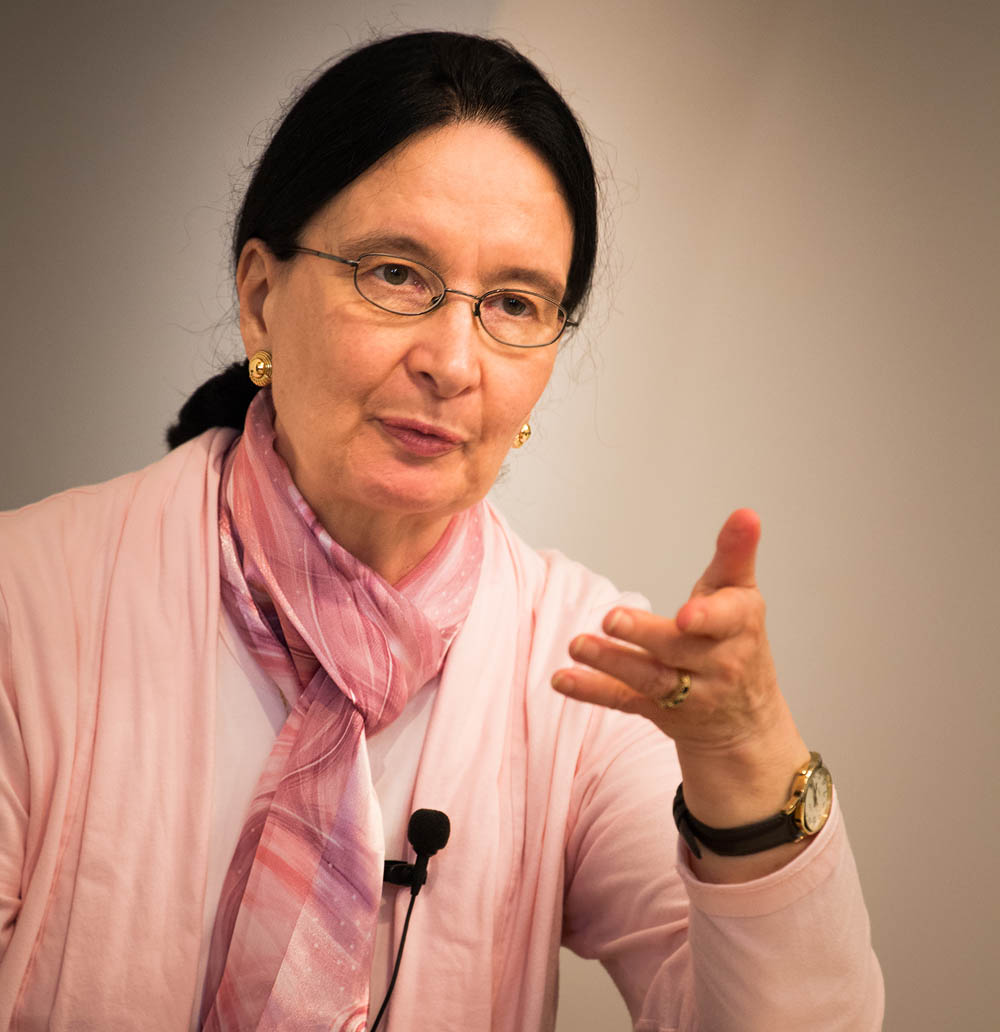
- Haack in 2013
- Born: 23 July 1945; Buckinghamshire, England
- Died: 10 March 2026 (aged 80); Miami, Florida, U.S.

Education
- Education: University of Oxford; University of Cambridge
- Doctoral advisor: Timothy Smiley
- Other advisor: David Pears

Philosophical work
- Era: Contemporary philosophy
- Region: Western philosophy
- School: Analytic; Neopragmatism
- Institutions: University of Miami
- Main interests: Philosophy of science Philosophy of logic Epistemology; Pragmatism
- Notable ideas: Foundherentism

Susan Haack (/hæk/; 23 July 1945 – 10 March 2026) was a British philosopher and academic who was a distinguished professor in the humanities, Cooper Senior Scholar in Arts and Sciences, professor of philosophy, and professor of law at the University of Miami in Coral Gables, Florida.

Haack wrote on logic, the philosophy of language, epistemology, and metaphysics. Her pragmatism followed that of Charles Sanders Peirce.

== Life and career ==
=== Education ===
Haack was a graduate of the University of Oxford and the University of Cambridge (B.A., B.Phil., Oxford; Ph.D., Cambridge). She was elected into Phi Beta Kappa as an honorary member. At Oxford, she studied at St. Hilda's College, where her first philosophy teacher was Jean Austin, the widow of J. L. Austin. As an undergraduate, she took Politics, Philosophy and Economics and said of her taste for philosophy: "it was, initially, the 'politics' part that most appealed to me. But somewhere down the line, despite encouragement from my politics tutor to pursue that subject, philosophy took over."

She studied Plato with Gilbert Ryle and logic with Michael Dummett. David Pears supervised her B.Phil. dissertation on ambiguity. At Cambridge, she wrote her PhD under the supervision of Timothy Smiley. She held the positions of Fellow of New Hall, Cambridge and professor of philosophy at the University of Warwick before taking a position at the University of Miami.

Haack said of her career that she was "very independent":

rather than follow philosophical fads and fashions, I pursue questions I believe are important, and tackle them in the ways that seem most likely to yield results; I am beholden to no clique or citation cartel; I put no stock in the ranking of philosophy graduate programs over which my colleagues obsess; I accept no research or travel funds from my university; I avoid publishing in journals that insist on taking all the rights to my work; etc., etc. Naturally, this independence comes at a price; but it also earns me the freedom to do the best work I can, without self-censorship, and to communicate with a much wider audience than the usual "niche literature" does.

=== Philosophical work ===
Haack's major contribution to philosophy, in the 1993 book Evidence and Inquiry is her epistemological theory called foundherentism, which is her attempt to avoid the logical problems of both pure foundationalism (which is susceptible to infinite regress) and pure coherentism (which is susceptible to circularity). She illustrated this idea with the metaphor of the crossword puzzle. A highly simplified version of these proceeds as follows: Finding an answer using a clue is analogous to a foundational source (grounded in empirical evidence). Making sure that the interlocking words are mutually sensible is analogous to justification through coherence. Both are necessary components in the justification of knowledge.

Haack was a fierce critic of Richard Rorty. She wrote a play, We Pragmatists ...: Peirce and Rorty in Conversation, consisting entirely of quotes from Charles Sanders Peirce and Richard Rorty. She performed the role of Peirce. Haack published a vigorous essay in the New Criterion, taking strong exception to many of Rorty's views, especially his claim to be a sort of pragmatist.

In Manifesto of a Passionate Moderate, Haack is highly critical of the view that there is a specifically female perspective on logic and scientific truth and is critical of feminist epistemology. She holds that many feminist critiques of science and philosophy are excessively concerned with political correctness.

Haack described her 2003 book Defending Science – Within Reason: Between Scientism and Cynicism, as a defence of scientific inquiry from the moderate viewpoint. During an interview with D.J. Grothe, then of the Center for Inquiry, Haack put forward the proposition that those on the far left consider science to be rhetoric motivated by power or politics, and she then proceeds to show how science can, and often does provide real benefits and gains, regardless of what the left may claim. The book offers her theory of scientific inquiry in response to what she perceives as the narrow logical models of rationality proposed by some other philosophers of science. Haack's opinion on the topic of inquiry, whoever may be undertaking it, is that good evidence, sound methods, transparent review and fitting new discovery into the collective sphere of human knowledge are signs of robust inquiry. Haack claims that quality inquiry can be done by many, however the scientific community has numerous tools or helps that have brought many benefits to mankind, and which help foster science's credibility. These tools and helps may not be available to those engaged in individual inquiry. When asked about how she responds to paranormal or supernatural claims, Haack indicates supporters of such claims have a heavy burden of proof. Rather than labelling such claims as pseudo-science, she admits these things can be "pretty bad stuff" and if they are to be considered seriously, they would need extraordinary evidence, and that such evidence should fit with the best warranted scientific theory about how things are. In this interview, Haack also responds to the question of religion's compatibility with science. She agrees there is great tension between the two. While stating her disagreement with British philosopher of religion Richard G. Swinburne and Stephen Jay Gould, she referred to the pertinent chapter of her book for a comprehensive understanding of her views on this matter.

In the related chapter ten of Defending Science, Haack disagrees with Gould's claim that science and religion have their own distinct domains that do not overlap. (See NOMA). Haack also disagrees with Swinburne. Haack believes that while scientists, historians and detectives play a useful role in scientific inquiry, theologians do not. Haack shows how religion and science make claims about how the world is. She shows how science and religion also make assertions as to what could lead to a better human condition. By these statements, Haack shows that religion and science do not enjoy their own separate space. She points out areas where prior and current religious claims about the natural universe are strongly refuted by the best warranted findings of science. She also stipulates that controversy, and unanswered questions abound in modern science. She summarises her defence for scientific inquiry by stating that she makes no apology for reserving her "greatest admiration for those who delight to exercise the mind, no matter which way it takes them...those for whom doing their damnedest with the mind, no holds barred, is a point of honor".

She wrote for Free Inquiry magazine and the Council for Secular Humanism. Haack's work has been reviewed and cited in the popular press, such as The Times Literary Supplement as well as in academic journals.

=== Death ===
Haack died on 10 March 2026, at the age of 80.

== Memberships ==
Haack was an honorary member of Phi Beta Kappa and Phi Kappa Phi, a past President of the Charles S. Peirce Society, and a past member of the US/UK Educational Commission.

== Selected writings ==
- Deviant Logic. Cambridge University Press, 1974.
- Haack, Susan; Kolenda, Konstantin (1977). "Two Fallibilists in Search of the Truth". Proceedings of the Aristotelian Society. 51 (Supplementary Volumes): 63–104. doi:10.1093/aristoteliansupp/51.1.63. JSTOR 4106816. (Charles Sanders Peirce and Karl Popper have strikingly similar views on the propensity theory of probability and philosophy of science.)
- Philosophy of Logics. Cambridge University Press, 1978.
- Evidence and Inquiry. Blackwell, 1993. Second edition, Prometheus Books 2009.
- Deviant Logic, Fuzzy Logic: Beyond the Formalism. The University of Chicago Press, 1996. (Extends the 1974 Deviant Logic, with some additional essays published between 1973 and 1980, particularly on fuzzy logic, cf The Philosophical Review, 107:3, 468–471 )
- "Vulgar Rortyism," The New Criterion 16, 1997.
- Manifesto of a Passionate Moderate: Unfashionable Essays. The University of Chicago Press, 1997.
- Defending Science – Within Reason: Between Scientism and Cynicism. Prometheus Books, 2003. ISBN 1-59102-117-0.
- "Trial and Error: The Supreme Court's Philosophy of Science". American Journal of Public Health, 2005.
- Pragmatism, Old and New (Robert Lane, associate editor). Prometheus Books, 2006.
- Putting Philosophy to Work: Inquiry and Its Place in Culture. Prometheus Books, 2008.
- Evidence Matters: Science, Proof and Truth in the Law. Cambridge University Press, 2014.

== Sources ==
- Christian, Rose Ann (2009). "Restricting the Scope of the Ethics of Belief: Haack's Alternative to Clifford and James". J Am Acad Relig. 77 (3): 461–493. doi:10.1093/jaarel/lfp037.
