= William Stanton (mason) =

English mason and sculptor

William Stanton (1639–1705) was an English mason and sculptor. He is known particularly for monumental masonry. He is often referred to as Stanton of Holborn.

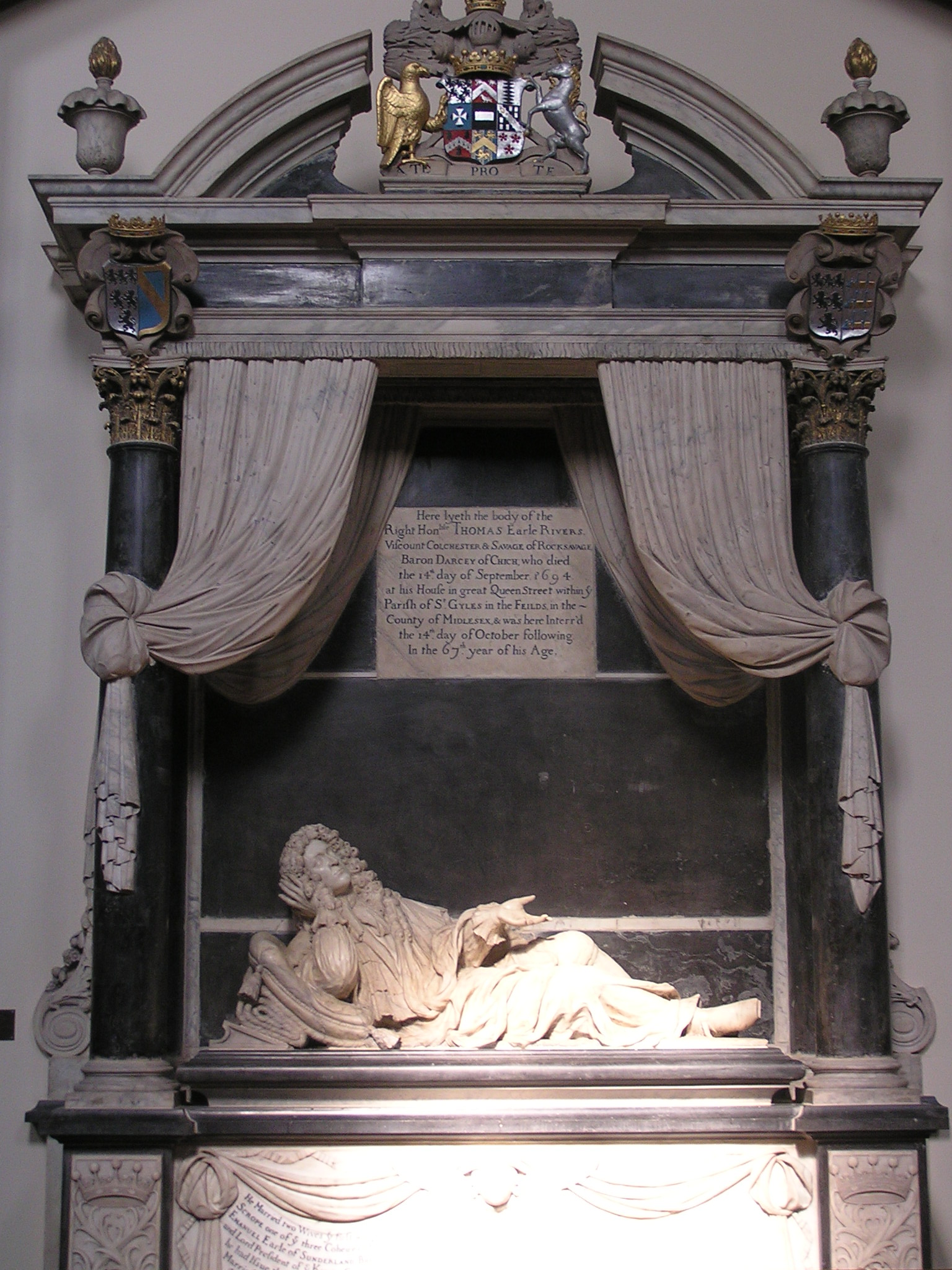
William Stanton, 1694 memorial to Thomas Savage, 3rd Earl Rivers in St Michael's Church, Macclesfield, Cheshire, UK.

== Life ==
He was son of Edward Stanton (d.1686), and nephew of the mason Thomas Stanton (d.1674). Thomas Stanton had set up a business adjacent to St Andrew Holborn in the first half of the seventeenth century.

In 1663 William Stanton became free of the Masons' Company, and was Master of the Company in 1688 and 1689. He worked at Gray's Inn around 1672. In 1686 he became master-mason at Belton House, followed by a commission at Denham Place from 1689; and in 1701 was working at Stonyhurst. Over 30 of his church monuments are recorded.

His apprentices included "Thomas Hill the Younger" son of Thomas Hill Master of the Worshipful Company of Masons.

He died in 1705 and is buried in St Andrew's Church, Holborn.

== Monuments ==
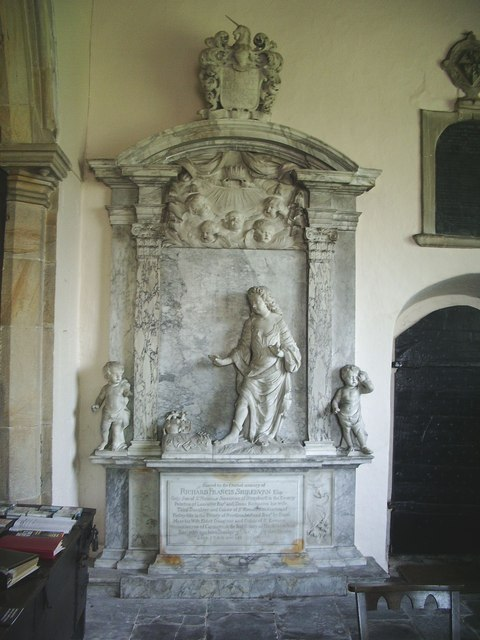
Shireburn monument All Hallows Church, Mitton

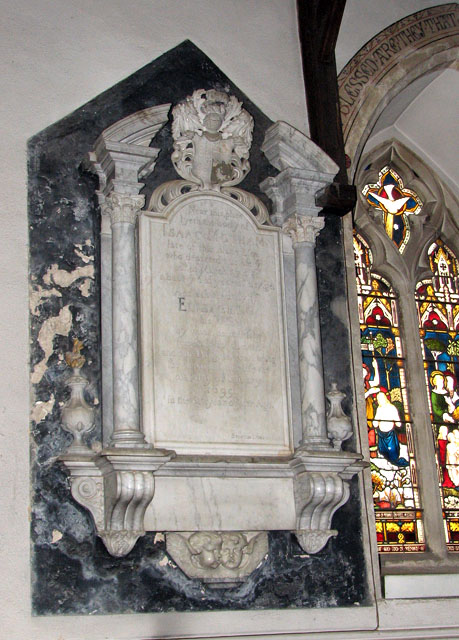
Memorial to Isaac Motham and his wife in St Remigius Church, Hethersett, Norfolk, UK.

The following is a list of people whose monuments are known to have been created by Stanton and the monument's location:

- John Byde in Bengeo (1665)
- Hon. Penelope Egerton in Westminster Abbey (1670)
- John Bromley (born c. 1611, died 1674; younger son of Sir Thomas Bromley of Holt Castle) in Worcester Cathedral (1674)
- Charles Harsnett in Westminster Abbey (1674)
- Sir John Dormer and his wife Susanna in Quainton (1675)
- Dr Walter Balcanqual in Chirk Church (1678)
- Elizabeth Davies in Monken Hadley (1678)
- Sir John Brownlow, 3rd Baronet and his wife in St Peter and St Paul's Church, Belton (1679)
- Sir Edward Sebright in Besford (1679)
- Ann Filding, Lady Morland in Westminster Abbey (1680)
- Ornate pillars in the cloister of the Inner Temple, London (1680)
- William Emmott in Colne (1683)
- John Archer in Theydon Garnon Church (1683)
- Sir Richard Harison and his wife in Hurst, Berkshire (1683)
- The Ladies Hatton in Gretton, Northamptonshire (1684)
- Sir Richard Newdigate, 1st Baronet and his wife in Harefield (1685)
- Mrs Elizabeth Beane at Hythe, Kent (c.1685)
- Sir Richard Atkins, 2nd Baronet and Lady Atkins at St Paul's Church, Clapham (c.1689)
- William Mellish at Ragnell, Nottinghamshire (1690)
- Charles Holloway at St Mary's Church in Oxford (1695)
- Lady Bagot at Blithfield (1695)
- Rev Richard Lucy at Christ Church in Brecon (1696)
- Memorial to Lord Rivers at Macclesfield (1696)
- Abraham Stanyon at Harefield (1696)
- Sir John Assheton in Downham (1697)
- Ralph Skynner in Hitchin (1697)
- Chancellor William Lucy at Christ Church in Brecon (1697)
- Lady Isham in Lamport Church (1699)
- Thomas Coventry, 1st Earl of Coventry in Elmley Castle (1699)
- Isaac Motham in Hethersett (1699)
- Lady Williamson in Monkwearmouth (1699)
- Lord Lonsdale in Lowther, Westmorland (1700)
- Richard Shireburn, Mitton church (1701) commissioned by Sir Nicholas Shireburn
- Tomb of Dean Henry Fairfax in Norwich Cathedral (1702)
- Judith Chester at Barkway (1702)
- Owen Bold at Wrexham (1703)
- Ornamentation at Stonyhurst House (1703)
- Lord Thomas Howard (1651-1701) in Ashtead Church (1703)
- Robert Sidney, 4th Earl of Leicester in Penshurst Church (1704)

== Family ==
His wife Dorothy died in 1707 and is buried in St Andrew's Church, Holborn.

Edward Stanton was his son.
