= Neil Tennant (philosopher) =

American philosopher (born 1950)

- Born: 1 March 1950 (age 76); Union of South Africa

Education
- Education: Wolfson College, Cambridge
- Doctoral advisor: Timothy Smiley

Philosophical work
- Era: Contemporary philosophy
- Region: Western philosophy
- School: Analytic
- Institutions: Ohio State University
- Main interests: Metaphysics; Philosophy of logic
- Notable ideas: Anti-realist semantics for empirical language Core Logic

Neil Tennant (born 1 March 1950) is an American philosopher. He is Arts & Humanities Distinguished Professor of Philosophy at the Ohio State University; and, before taking up his appointment at the Ohio State University, he held positions at the University of Edinburgh, the University of Stirling, and the Australian National University.

== Work ==
Along with Michael Dummett and Crispin Wright, Tennant is one of the most notable figures who have attempted to extend the project of providing anti-realist semantics for empirical language. He has also written extensively on intuitionistic logic and other non-classical logics.

Tennant was the editor of the journal American Philosophical Quarterly from 2004 to 2007.

He was elected to the Australian Academy of the Humanities, as a Corresponding Fellow, in 1990.

== Selected publications ==
- Natural Logic, Edinburgh University Press, 1978, ix+196pp.; Japanese translation by T. Fujimura for Orion Press, 1981; second, revised edition, 1990.
- Philosophy, Evolution and Human Nature (with F. von Schilcher), Routledge and Kegan Paul, 1984, viii+283 pp.
- Anti-Realism and Logic: Truth as Eternal, Clarendon Library of Logic and Philosophy, Oxford University Press, 1987, xii+325 pp.
- Autologic, Edinburgh University Press, 1992, xiii+239 pp.
- The Taming of the True, Oxford University Press, 1997, xvii+465 pp. Paperback edition 2002.
- "On the Degeneracy of the Full AGM-Theory of Theory-Revision", Journal of Symbolic Logic, vol. 71, no. 2, pp. 661–676, June 2006.
- "New Foundations for a Relational Theory of Theory-Revision", Journal of Philosophical Logic, vol. 35, no. 5, pp. 489–52, October 2006.
- Introducing Philosophy: God, Mind, World, and Logic, Routledge, 2015.
- Core Logic, Oxford University Press, 2017.

== See also ==
- American philosophy
