= Jeremy Butterfield =

British philosopher (born 1954)

Jeremy Butterfield FBA
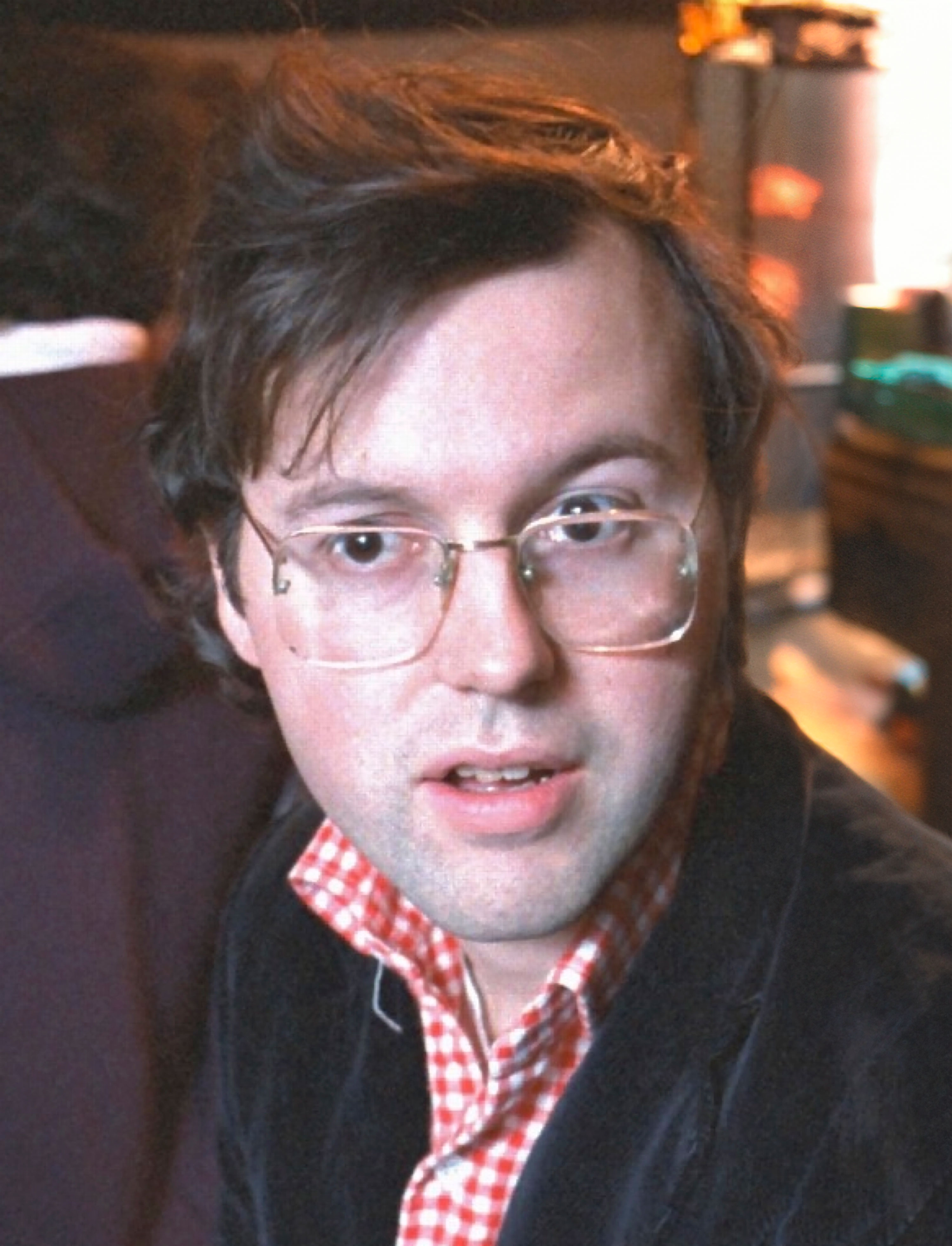
- Jeremy Butterfield in 1982
- Born: Jeremy Nicholas Butterfield; 1954 (age 71–72)

Education
- Education: University of Cambridge
- Thesis: Logic and Time (1984)
- Doctoral advisors: David Malament; D. H. Mellor

Philosophical work
- Era: Contemporary philosophy
- Region: Western philosophy
- School: Analytic philosophy
- Institutions: All Souls College, Oxford; Trinity College, Cambridge
- Doctoral students: Tim Crane
- Main interests: Philosophy of physics, philosophy of science
- Notable ideas: Detensed theory of time

Jeremy Nicholas Butterfield (born 1954) is a British philosopher, noted particularly for his work on philosophical aspects of quantum field theory, relativity theory and classical mechanics.

== Biography ==
Butterfield was educated at Trinity College, Cambridge, obtaining his PhD degree from the University of Cambridge in 1984; he was supervised by Hugh Mellor and David Malament. He was a lecturer in the philosophy faculty at Cambridge University and was later promoted to reader in 1997. In 1998, he became a senior research fellow at All Souls College at the University of Oxford; he returned to the University of Cambridge in his present position in 2006. He has held visiting positions at Princeton University, the University of Pittsburgh and the University of Sydney.

Butterfield is a fellow of the British Academy and a senior research fellow of Trinity College, Cambridge. He is a past president of the British Society for the Philosophy of Science, and of the Mind Association. He previously served on the governing board of the Philosophy of Science Association and on the executive committee of the British Philosophical Association. He co-founded the journal Studies in History and Philosophy of Modern Physics, and edited it until 2001. He serves on the editorial boards of several journals and book series.

== Research ==
Butterfield's research centres on a variety of topics in the philosophy of physics and philosophy of science, and he has also made contributions to the philosophy of language and logic, particularly with regard to the treatment of time and tense. In this regard, he has argued in several papers for a detensed theory of time, according to which the present is a merely subjective or indexical notion, on analogy with one's spatial location.

In the philosophy of quantum theory, Butterfield has proposed several clarifications of the notions of locality operative in algebraic quantum field theories (especially 'stochastic Einstein locality'), and has investigated which of these clarified versions of locality hold in those theories. He has also investigated the impact of the Bell inequalities in the light of Reichenbach's principle of the common cause, and has argued that the violation of these inequalities implies causation between the space-like separated wings of a Bell experiment. In addition, he has written on the quantum measurement problem, and the implications for it due to, and of it for, the philosophy and science of consciousness. He has also investigated the problems of localizability in relativistic quantum theories, in collaboration with Gordon Fleming.

In the philosophy of spacetime physics, Butterfield has argued for a resolution of Einstein's 1913 hole argument that preserves spacetime substantivalism by utilizing David Lewis's theory of modal counterparts. More recently, he has appealed to tensor calculus, and its use in much of contemporary physics, to argue against the popular view (propounded by David Lewis) that the world may be described in terms of 'local matters of fact'; i.e. in terms of chiefly intrinsic properties instantiated at spatial or spatio-temporal points.

In the philosophy of classical mechanics, Butterfield has investigated the elimination of descriptively redundant formal elements through symplectic reduction, and the interdependence between conserved quantities and conservation laws. He has also made several appeals in his work, on classical mechanics and other physical theories, to the importance of an appreciation of modality in physics.

In several papers, Butterfield has collaborated with the theoretical physicist Chris Isham. These address the role of topos theory in understanding quantum theory (in particular the Kochen–Specker theorem), and the status of time in the various quantum gravity research programmes.

In recent years, Butterfield has argued for a reconciliation of the idea of emergence – the idea that novel structures, not described by "fundamental" theories, appear at a certain level of complexity – with the possibility of inter-theoretic reduction. He has illustrated the reconciliation in various areas such as phase transitions, renormalization, and gauge theories. He has also worked, often in collaboration with research students, on other topics, including: (i) identity and individuation of systems in quantum physics; (ii) dualities especially gauge/gravity duality; (iii) under-determination, and scientific realism, in modern cosmology.

== Publications ==
- Philosophy of Physics (Handbook of the Philosophy of Science) 2 volume set (ed. with John Earman), North Holland, 2006.
- Quantum Entanglements: Selected Papers of Rob Clifton (ed. with Hans Halverson), Oxford University Press, 2004.
- Non-Locality and Modality (ed. with Thomasz Placek), Kluwer Academic Publishing, 2002.
- The Arguments of Time (ed.), Oxford University Press, 2000.
- From Physics to Philosophy (ed. with Constantine Pagonis), Cambridge University Press, 1999.
- Spacetime (ed. with Mark Hogarth and Gordon Belot), Dartmouth Publishing, 1996.
- Language, Mind and Logic (ed.), Cambridge University Press, 1984.
