= Knightbridge Professor of Philosophy =

The Knightbridge Professorship of Philosophy is the senior professorship in philosophy at the University of Cambridge. There have been 22 Knightbridge professors, the incumbent being Rae Langton.

== History ==
One of the oldest professorships in Cambridge, the chair was founded in 1683 by John Knightbridge (1619/20–1677), a clergyman and Fellow of Peterhouse. Knightbridge gave money for its foundation on his death in 1677. The terms of his will required the Professor to be a Doctor or Bachelor of Divinity; to be aged fifty or older; and to give five lectures in Latin each term, providing a written copy of these lectures to the Vice Chancellor. If the Professor did not give the required five lectures without a good reason, then their maintenance (£50 per annum) could be withdrawn.

The Will also laid out that the Professor would be chosen by election by the Regius and the Lady Margaret's Professors of Divinity, the Master of Peterhouse and the Vice-Chancellor of Cambridge, with the latter having the casting vote. This has given rise to a story that in 1813 Francis Barnes was able to secure his own election to the Professorship, because he was Master of Peterhouse as well as Vice-Chancellor. However, the story is almost certainly apocryphal since Barnes was not Vice-Chancellor at the time.

The trustees of Knightbridge's Will were unable to find a suitable person to be elected to the Professorship according to these terms. They therefore appealed to the Court of Chancery to relax and modify the original restrictions. A decree was obtained in 18 July 1682, allowing the Professor to be aged forty or older, and to deliver four lectures in each term rather than five. In 1683 the first election to the chair took place, and Thomas Smoult of St John's College was appointed, more than five years after Knightbridge's death. Smoult further endowed the Professorship with a bequest upon his death in 1707, leaving £300 to purchase land so that the rents could be used to maintain the Knightbridge Professor. This increased the stipend to around £70 per annum. The requirements for the Professor regarding their age and the number of lectures that they were required to deliver, were repealed in 1861. In 1882, the requirement that the post holder should be a Doctor or Bachelor of Divinity was also repealed.

It is unlikely that any of the holders of the Knightbridge Professorship gave the required lectures until the nineteenth century. William Whewell who was appointed to the Professorship in 1838, gave evidence to the University Commission stating that he was not aware that any predecessor to the post had lectured.

Originally entitled the "Professorship of Moral Theology or Casuisticall Divinity", with the holder often known as simply the "Professor of Casuistry", it was subsequently designated the Professorship of Moral Theology, Casuistical Divinity, and Moral Philosophy. In 1896 it became the Professorship of Moral Philosophy. The scope of the professorship was officially broadened from merely moral to general philosophy under its present name in 1965.

== Knightbridge Professors ==
- Thomas Smoult (1683)
- John Colbatch (1707)
- Richard Walker (1744)
- Edmund Law (1764)
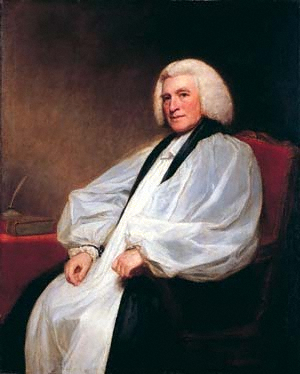
  Edmund Law (1703–1787), by George Romney, 1781
- Robert Plumptre (1769)
- George Borlase (1788)
- Robert Towerson Cory (1809)
- Francis Barnes (1813)
- William Whewell (1838)
- John Grote (1855)
- F. D. Maurice (1866)
- Thomas Rawson Birks (1872)
- Henry Sidgwick (1883)
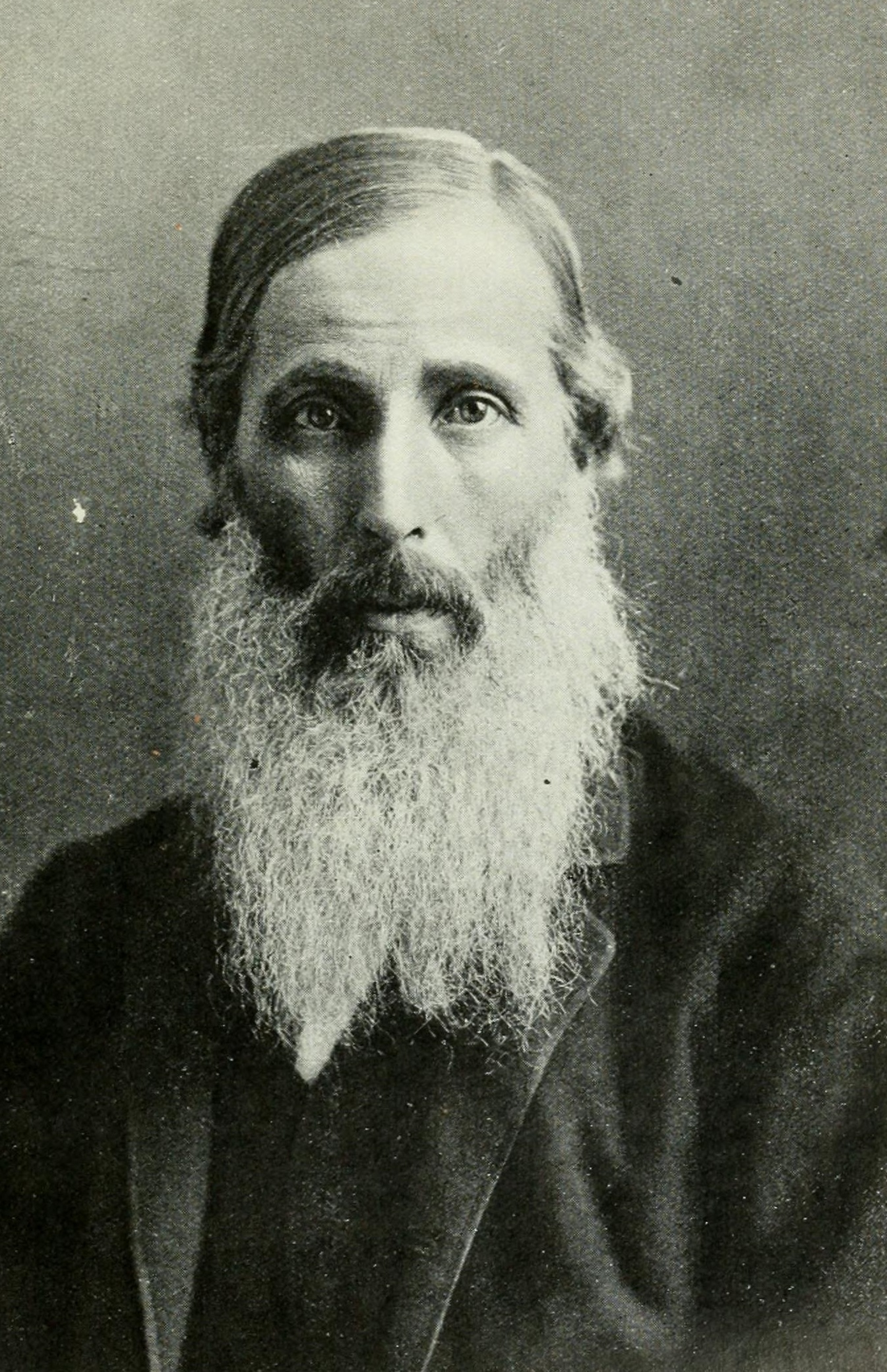
  Portrait of Henry Sidgwick
- W. R. Sorley (1900)
- C. D. Broad (1933)
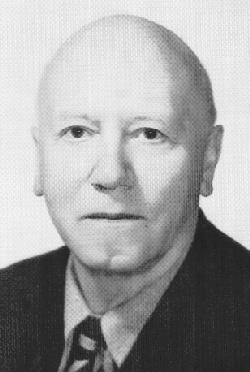
  C. D. Broad, philosopher
- Richard Bevan Braithwaite (1953)
- Bernard Williams (1967)
- Timothy Smiley (1980)
- Edward Craig (1998)
- Quassim Cassam (2007)
- Tim Crane (2009)
- Rae Langton (2017)
