= Thomas Smoult =

Thomas Smoult (1631 or 1632 – 9 July 1707) was the first Professor of Moral Theology or Casuistical Divinity in 1683 at the University of Cambridge to the post now known as the Knightbridge Professor of Philosophy. The professorship was founded in 1677 by John Knightbridge, a vicar of Spofforth in Yorkshire and Fellow of Peterhouse, Cambridge. He left a stipend of 50 pounds per annum. This was augmented by Smoult, who gave 300 pounds to purchase land.

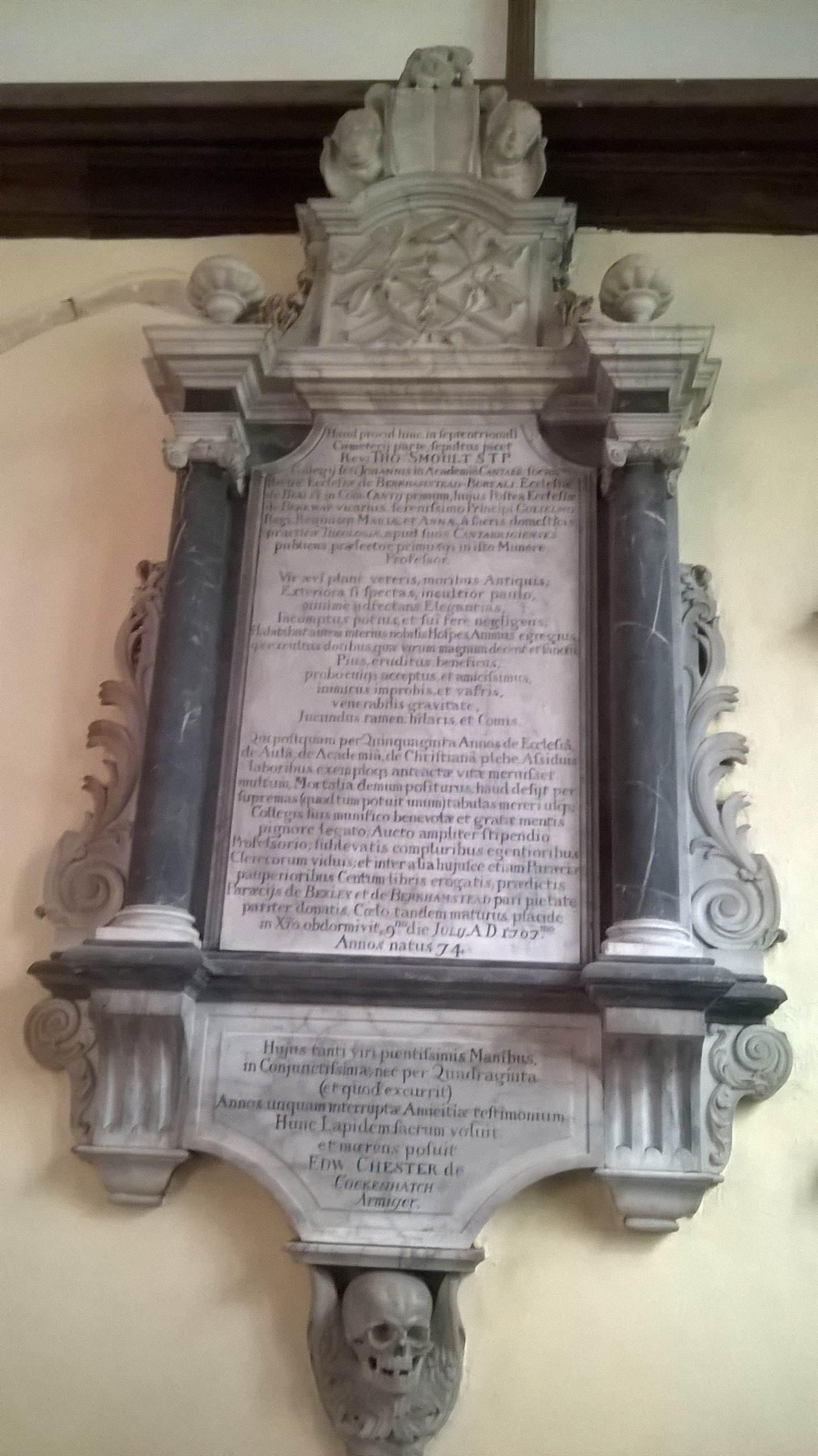
Plaque for Thomas Smoult in Barkway, Hertfordshire

== Life ==
Thomas Smoult was born in Lathom, Lancashire, the son of Edward (Edmund) a gentleman.

Smoult matriculated at St John's College, Cambridge in 1651 aged 19, graduating BA in 1654/5, MA in 1659, BD in 1666, DD in 1684. He became a Fellow at St John's in 1664. He held various church livings in Hertfordshire and Kent including Northchurch, Hertfordshire; Bexley, Kent, 1659–65; Barkway, Hertfordshire, 1666–94; and Berkhampstead, 1693. From 1697 until his death he was Royal Chaplain. His memorial is by Edward Stanton.

In his will Smoult bequeathed £100 for the purchase of books for the library at St John's. Bexley National School, London was built from an earlier endowment by him to the parish in 1703. This school is dated 1834.
