= Timothy Smiley =

British philosopher (1930–2026)

Timothy Smiley FBA
- Born: Timothy John Smiley; 13 November 1930; London, England
- Died: 19 October 2026 (aged 95); Cambridge, England

Education
- Education: Clare College, Cambridge
- Doctoral advisor: Stourton William Peile Steen

Philosophical work
- Era: Contemporary philosophy
- Region: Western philosophy
- School: Analytic philosophy
- Institutions: Clare College, Cambridge
- Doctoral students: See list: Thomas Baldwin; Chris Brink; Susan Haack; Neil Tennant
- Main interests: Mathematical logic Philosophical logic
- Notable ideas: Multiple-conclusion logic, plural logic

Timothy John Smiley (13 November 1930 – 19 October 2026) was a British philosopher and logician who served as Knightbridge Professor of Philosophy at Clare College, Cambridge (1980–1998) until his retirement as emeritus. He specialised in mathematical logic and philosophical logic.

== Life and career ==
Timothy Smiley was born in London, the son of M. T. Smiley and T. M. Smiley (née Browne). He was educated at Ardwyn Grammar School, Aberystwyth, followed by Ampleforth College (1943–1948). He then spent the year of 1948–1949 at the University of Fribourg, where his interest in logic was inspired by I.M. Bocheński. He then went up to Clare College, Cambridge to read Mathematics in 1949. He obtained his BA degree in 1952 followed by a PhD in 1956 on "Natural Systems of Logic".

After completing his PhD, he remained at Cambridge on a Research Fellowship at Clare (1955–59), then as a tutor and lecturer in philosophy. He also qualified as a pilot in the Air Ministry and was called to the bar at Gray's Inn.

In 1980 he was appointed Knightbridge Professor of Philosophy, a post he held until his retirement in 1998. In 1982–83 he was President of the Aristotelian Society and in 1984 he was elected a Fellow of the British Academy.

Smiley died on 19 October 2026, aged 95.

== Work ==
Smiley published in a wide range of philosophical areas, including Aristotle, definite descriptions, modal logic, multiple conclusion logic, negation and denial, plurals, set-theoretic foundations for mathematics and validity. He collaborated on a number of articles and, ultimately, a book on plural descriptions and plural logic with Alex Oliver.

His doctoral students included Thomas Baldwin, Chris Brink, Susan Haack and Neil Tennant.

== Published works ==
A full bibliography of works published between 1959 and 2009 is included in the Festschrift, The Force of Argument: Essays in Honor of Timothy Smiley (2010).

Books

- Studies in the Philosophy of Logic and Knowledge, (co-edited with Thomas Baldwin.)
- Mathematics and Necessity: Essays in the History of Philosophy.
- Philosophical Logic.
- Philosophical Dialogues: Plato, Hume, Wittgenstein. Dawes Hicks Lectures on Philosophy.
- Smiley and D. J. Shoesmith, Multiple-Conclusion Logic (1978).
- Smiley and Alex Oliver, Plural Logic (2013). (2nd ed. 2016)

Selected papers

- Sense Without Denotation. Analysis 1960; 20 (6): 125–135. doi: 10.1093/analys/20.6.125
- What is syllogism?. Journal of Philosophical Logic 1973 (2): 136–154.
- The Theory of Descriptions. (1981) In T. J. Smiley & Thomas Baldwin (eds.), Studies in the Philosophy of Logic and Knowledge. Published for the British Academy by Oxford University Press. pp. 131–61.
- Aristotle's completeness proof. Ancient Philosophy. 1994 (14): 25–38.
