= Hugh Mellor =

British philosopher (1938–2020)

Hugh Mellor FBA FAHA
- Born: David Hugh Mellor; 10 July 1938; London, England
- Died: 21 June 2020 (aged 81); Cambridge, England

Education
- Education: Pembroke College, Cambridge
- Doctoral advisor: Mary Hesse
- Other advisor: Herbert Feigl

Philosophical work
- Era: Contemporary philosophy
- Region: Western philosophy
- School: Analytic philosophy
- Institutions: Darwin College, Cambridge
- Doctoral students: Kwame Anthony Appiah, Jeremy Butterfield, Tim Crane, Robin Le Poidevin, Huw Price, Rebecca Roache, Nigel Warburton
- Notable students: Alexander Bird, Ben Colburn, Peter Menzies, David Papineau
- Main interests: Metaphysics; Philosophy of science Philosophy of mind Philosophy of time
- Notable ideas: Mellor's account of chance (chances as objective, empirical probabilities)

David Hugh Mellor (/ˈmɛlər/; 10 July 1938 – 21 June 2020) was a British philosopher. He was a Professor of Philosophy and Pro-Vice-Chancellor, later Professor Emeritus, of the University of Cambridge.

== Biography ==
Mellor was born in London on 10 July 1938, and educated at Manchester Grammar School. He studied chemical engineering at Pembroke College, Cambridge (BA, 1960). His first formal study of philosophy was at the University of Minnesota where he took a minor in Philosophy of Science under Herbert Feigl. From Minnesota he obtained an MSc degree in 1962. He obtained his PhD degree in philosophy, with a thesis written under the supervision of Mary Hesse, at Pembroke in 1968. He was awarded an ScD degree from Cambridge in 1990.

His primary work was in metaphysics, although his philosophical interests included philosophy of science, philosophy of mind, philosophy of time, probability and causation, laws of nature and properties, and decision theory. Mellor was Professor of Philosophy at the University of Cambridge and Fellow of Darwin College from 1971 to 2005.

Mellor was in the news in 1992, when he argued against Cambridge awarding an honorary degree to Jacques Derrida, a French philosopher known for his theory of "deconstruction". A formal ballot decided to award the degree, but Mellor said it was undeserved, explaining: "He is a mediocre, unoriginal philosopher – he is not even interestingly bad." He also commented that it had been "a bad year for bullshit in Cambridge."

Mellor was president of the Aristotelian Society from 1992 to 1993, a member of the Humanist Philosophers' Group of the British Humanist Association and Honorary Fellow of the Australian Academy of the Humanities. He was a Fellow of the British Academy between 1983 and 2008. In retirement, Mellor held the title of emeritus professor.

A Festschrift, Real Metaphysics: Essays in Honour of D. H. Mellor, was published in 2003.

Mellor was also an amateur theatre actor.

He died on 21 June 2020.

== Publications ==
Authored

- The Matter of Chance (1971) – online.
- Real Time (1981). Cambridge University Press.
- Matters of Metaphysics (1991). Cambridge University Press.
- The Facts of Causation (1995). Routledge.
- Real Time II (1998). Routledge.
- Probability: A Philosophical Introduction (2005). Routledge.
- Mind, Meaning, and Reality (2012). Oxford University Press

Edited

- Prospects for Pragmatism: Essays in Memory of F P Ramsey (1980)
- Science, Belief and Behaviour Essays in Honour of R B Braithwaite.(1980)
- F. P. Ramsey: Philosophical Papers. Cambridge University Press. (1990)
- (with Hallvard Lillehammer) Ramsey's Legacy (2005)

*For more complete publication details see the tribute page by Tim Crane.
