= Multiple-conclusion logic =

Mathematical logic

A multiple-conclusion logic is one in which logical consequence is a relation, $\vdash$, between two sets of sentences (or propositions). $\Gamma \vdash \Delta$ is typically interpreted as meaning that whenever each element of $\Gamma$ is true, some element of $\Delta$ is true; and whenever each element of $\Delta$ is false, some element of $\Gamma$ is false. Such a reading is related to Gerhard Gentzen's interpretation of the multiple-succedent sequent calculus LK, though Gentzen interprets his sequents $\Gamma\vdash\Delta$ as formulae $(\bigwedge\Gamma)\supset(\bigvee\Delta)$.

This form of logic was developed in the 1970s by D. J. Shoesmith and Timothy Smiley but has not been widely adopted.

Some logicians (for example, Greg Restall) favor a multiple-conclusion consequence relation over the more traditional single-conclusion relation on the grounds that the latter is asymmetric (in the informal, non-mathematical sense) and favors truth over falsity (or assertion over denial).

== See also ==
- Sequent calculus
