= Quassim Cassam =

British philosopher

Quassim Cassam FBA
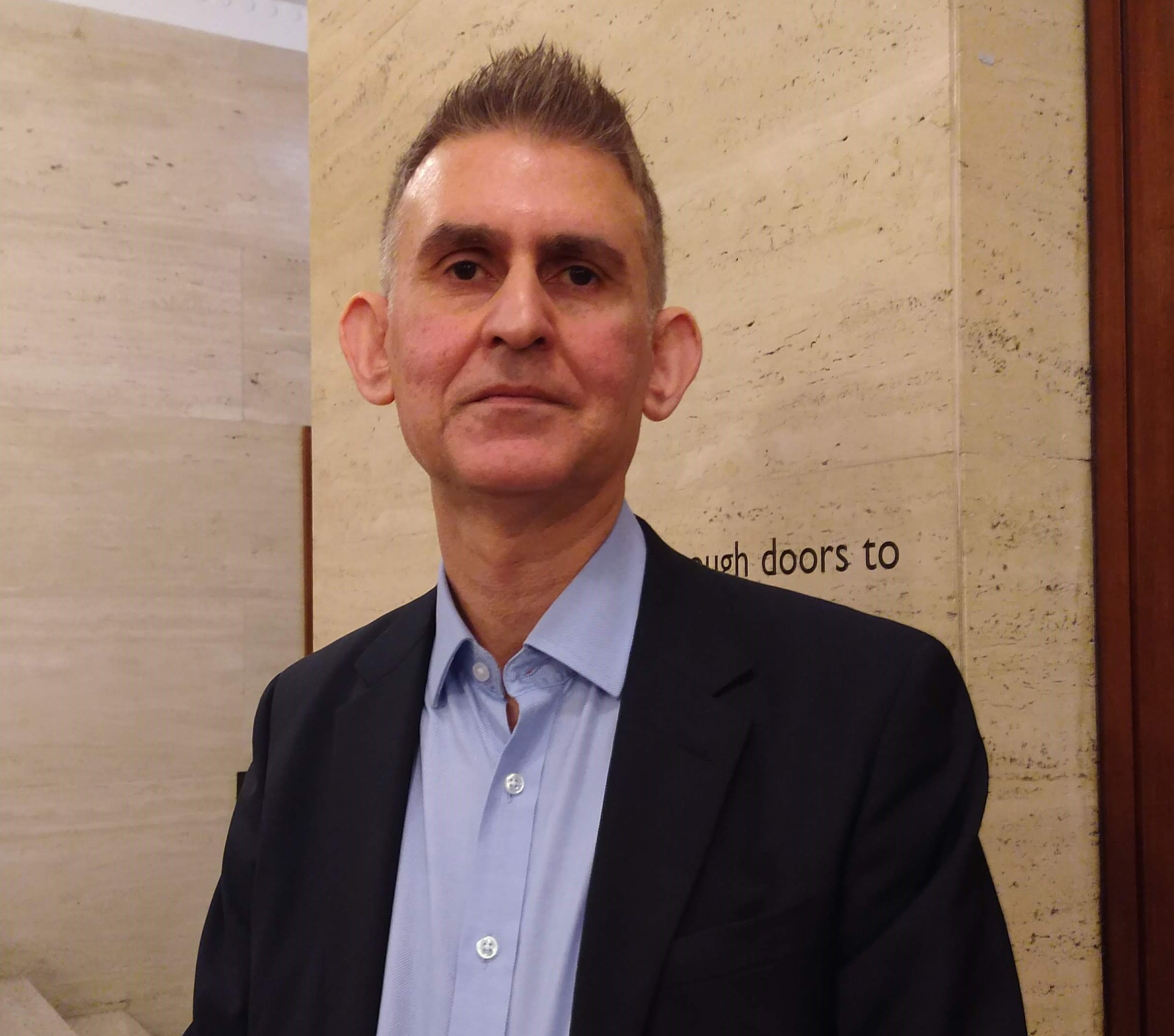
- Professor Cassam in 2019
- Born: 31 January 1961 (age 65)

Academic background
- Education: Keble College, Oxford

Academic work
- Discipline: Philosophy
- Sub-discipline: epistemology; Kant; self-knowledge; perception; epistemic vices
- Institutions: Wadham College, Oxford; Northwestern University; University College London; University of Cambridge; University of Warwick

Quassim Cassam, FBA (born 31 January 1961) is professor of philosophy at the University of Warwick and an Honorary Fellow of Keble College, University of Oxford. He was a visiting professor at Sorbonne University. He writes on extremism, terrorism, self-knowledge, perception, epistemic vices and topics in Kantian epistemology. He is author of seven books, mainly known for his two works, Vices of the Mind (2019) and Extremism: A Philosophical Analysis (2022).

== Early life and education ==
Quassim Cassam was born in Mombasa, Kenya, to a Gujarati Ismaili family. His parents and grandparents were all born in Kenya. His great-grandparents were born in Gujarat, India, and emigrated to Kenya in the 1890s. He was a Kenyan citizen until the age of 18 but has spent most of his adult life in the U.K. He studied Philosophy, Politics and Economics (PPE) at Keble College, Oxford and was awarded an Oxford doctorate in 1985 for a dissertation on transcendental arguments.

== Career ==
From 1986 to 2004 Cassam taught philosophy at Oxford University, where he was a Fellow of Wadham College. In 1993 he was visiting associate professor at the University of California, Berkeley. In 2004 he held the John Evans Distinguished Visiting Professorship in Moral and Intellectual Philosophy at Northwestern University, Illinois. He was Professor of Philosophy at University College London in 2005–06 and Knightbridge Professor of Philosophy at Cambridge University in 2007–08. Since 2009, Cassam has been a professor of philosophy at Warwick University. In 2016 he was awarded a Leadership Fellowship by the Arts and Humanities Research Council in the UK. He has been a president of the Aristotelian Society (2010–11) and a Mind Senior Research Fellow (2012–13). In 2021 he was elected as an honorary fellow of the Keble College, Oxford.

On 22 July 2022, Cassam was elected a Fellow of the British Academy (FBA), the United Kingdom's national academy for the humanities and social sciences.

Cassam's early publications were mostly on Kant, including "Transcendental Arguments, Transcendental Synthesis, and Transcendental Idealism" (Philosophical Quarterly, 1987) and "Kant and Reductionism" (Review of Metaphysics, 1989). In recent times he has published work on epistemic vices and introduced the label 'vice epistemology' for the philosophical study of the nature and significance of epistemic vices such as closed-mindedness, overconfidence, dogmatism and wishful thinking

He is the author of seven books: Self and World (Oxford, 1997), The Possibility of Knowledge (Oxford, 2007), Self-Knowledge for Humans (Oxford, 2014), Berkeley's Puzzle: What Does Experience Teach Us? (Oxford, 2014, jointly with John Campbell), and, most recently, two books in applied epistemology: Vices of the Mind: From the Intellectual to the Political (Oxford, 2019), Conspiracy Theories (Polity, 2019) and Extremism: A Philosophical Analysis (Routledge, 2019).

He is also the editor of Self-Knowledge (Oxford, 1994) and the author of the Self-Knowledge bibliography in Oxford Bibliographies Online (Oxford, 2010).

Politically, Cassam has expressed views about the Gaza war, suggesting "that the only viable strategy for Israel in its conflict with Hamas is to continue the war begun in October 2023 until Hamas is 'crushed.'"

== Selected publications ==
- Self-Knowledge (editor), Oxford University Press (1994). ISBN 978-0-19875-115-1
- Self and World, Oxford University Press (1997). ISBN 978-0-19823-895-9
- The Possibility Of Knowledge, Clarendon Press (2007). ISBN 978-0-19920-831-9
- Berkeley's Puzzle: What Does Experience Teach Us? (co-authored with John Campbell), Oxford University Press (2014). ISBN 978-0-19877-756-4
- Self-Knowledge for Humans, Oxford University Press (2014). ISBN 978-0-19877-668-0
- Vices of the Mind: From the Intellectual to the Political, Oxford University Press (2019). ISBN 978-0-19882-690-3
- Conspiracy Theories, Polity Press (2019). ISBN 978-1-50953-582-8
- Vice Epistemology, Routledge (2020). ISBN 978-1-13850-443-1
- Extremism: A Philosophical Analysis, Routledge (2021). ISBN 978-0-36734-387-3
