= Katalin Farkas =

Hungarian philosopher

Katalin (Kati) Farkas (born 1970) is a Hungarian philosopher. The former president of the European Society for Analytic Philosophy, she works in Austria as the head of the philosophy department at the Central European University in Vienna. Her research involves epistemology and the philosophy of mind.

== Education and career ==
Farkas was born in 1970, in Budapest. After earning a master's degree in mathematics and philosophy from Eötvös Loránd University in 1993, she completed a PhD in 1997 through the Hungarian Academy of Sciences. In 2010 she earned a D.Sc. (the Hungarian equivalent of a habilitation), again through the Hungarian Academy of Sciences.

After postdoctoral research in 1997 and 1998 at the University of Liverpool, and two years as a research fellow at Eötvös Loránd University, she joined Central European University as an assistant professor in 2000. She was promoted to associate professor in 2006 and full professor in 2009. She headed the department of philosophy from 2007 to 2010, served the university as its provost and pro-rector from 2010 to 2014, and has been head of the department again since 2021.

Farkas became president of the European Society for Analytic Philosophy from 2020 through 2023.

== Recognition ==
Farkas was elected to the Academia Europaea in 2012.

== Personal life ==
Farkas is married to British philosopher Tim Crane.

== Books ==
Farkas is the author of The Subject's Point of View (Oxford University Press, 2008). With Tim Crane, she is co-editor of Metaphysics: A Guide and Anthology (Oxford University Press, 2004).
