= Thomas Baldwin (philosopher) =

British philosopher (born 1947)

Thomas R. Baldwin (born 1947) is a British philosopher and has been a professor of philosophy at the University of York since 1995. He has written generally on 20th century analytic and Continental philosophy, as well as bioethics, the philosophy of language and of mind, particularly with regard to G. E. Moore, Maurice Merleau-Ponty, and Bertrand Russell.

== Biography ==
Baldwin studied at Cambridge University, gaining an MA and a PhD before lecturing at Makerere University and Cambridge. He was editor of Mind from 2005 to 2015 and has served as the president of the Aristotelian Society (2006–07) and as Deputy Chair of the Human Fertilisation and Embryology Authority. He was Chair of the Nuffield Council on Bioethics Working Party on Novel Neurotechnologies (2013).

== Selected publications ==
- Contemporary Philosophy: Philosophy in English since 1945. Oxford University Press, 2001.
- Maurice Merleau-Ponty: Basic Writings (edited by Thomas Baldwin). Routledge, 2004.
- "Philosophy of Language in the Twentieth Century" in The Oxford Handbook of Philosophy of Language (edited by Ernest Lepore and Barry C. Smith). Oxford University Press: 2008.
- "Wittgenstein and Moore" in The Oxford Handbook of Wittgenstein (edited by Oskari Kuusela and Marie McGinn). Oxford University Press: 2011.
- G.E. Moore: Selected Writings (edited by Thomas Baldwin). Routledge, 2013.
- "G.E. Moore and the Cambridge School of Analysis" in The Oxford Handbook of the History of Analytic Philosophy (edited by Michael Beaney). Oxford University Press, 2013.
- "Merleau-Ponty's Phenomenological Critique of Natural Science" in Royal Institute of Philosophy Supplement 72 (edited by Havi Carel and Darian Meacham). Cambridge University Press: 2013.
- G. E. Moore: Early Philosophical Writings (edited by Thomas Baldwin and Consuelo Preti). Cambridge University Press, 2015.
