= Tim Crane =

British philosopher (born 1962)

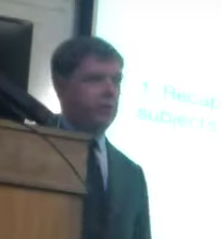
- Crane at a seminar on consciousness on 17 February 2016
- Born: Timothy Martin Crane; 17 October 1962 (age 64)

Education
- Education: University of Durham (BA); University of York (MA); Peterhouse, Cambridge (PhD)
- Thesis: The Content and Causation of Thought (1989)
- Doctoral advisor: Jeremy Butterfield; Hugh Mellor

Philosophical work
- Era: Contemporary philosophy
- Region: Western philosophy
- School: Analytic philosophy
- Institutions: King's College London; University College London; Institute of Philosophy; University of Cambridge; Central European University
- Main interests: Philosophy of mind, metaphysics
- Notable ideas: The nonconceptual content of experience
- Website: www.timcrane.com

Timothy Martin Crane (born 17 October 1962) is a British philosopher specialising in the philosophy of mind, philosophy of perception, philosophy of psychology and metaphysics.

His contributions to philosophy include a defence of a non-physicalist account of the mind; a defence of intentionalism about consciousness; a defence of the thesis that perceptual experience has nonconceptual content; a psychologistic approach to the objects of thought; and a defence of the thesis that intentionality is the mark of the mental. He is currently the Head of Department and Professor of Philosophy at Central European University, and was previously the Knightbridge Professor of Philosophy at the University of Cambridge and a Fellow of Peterhouse. For the academic year 2020–21 he was a visiting professor at the University of Lugano.

== Biography ==
Crane obtained his BA degree from the University of Durham, his MA degree from the University of York and his PhD degree in 1989 from the University of Cambridge, where he was a student at Peterhouse and studied with Jeremy Butterfield and Hugh Mellor. From 1990 to 2009, he taught at University College London, first as a lecturer, then as a reader, as a professor, and as head of department. He was director of the Institute of Philosophy in London from 2005 to 2008. He was appointed as the Knightbridge Professor of Philosophy at the University of Cambridge in September 2009. He is also the philosophy editor of The Times Literary Supplement.

In August 2017, he joined the Department of Philosophy at Central European University, assuming a full professorship.

He is the brother of composer Laurence Crane. He is married to the philosopher Katalin Farkas, who also teaches at Central European University.

== Books ==
Authored books

- The Meaning of Belief (Cambridge, Massachusetts: Harvard University Press, 2017)
- Aspects of Psychologism (Cambridge, Massachusetts: Harvard University Press, 2014)
- The Objects of Thought (Oxford: Oxford University Press, 2013)
- Intentionalität als Merkmal des Geistigen: Sechs Essays zur Philosophie des Geistes, translated by Markus Wild and Simone Ungerer (Frankfurt: Fischer Verlag 2007).
- Elements of Mind (Oxford: Oxford University Press 2001)
- The Mechanical Mind: A Philosophical Introduction to Minds, Machines and Mental Representation (Harmondsworth: Penguin Books 1995)
  - Second edition, substantially revised with one wholly new chapter (London: Routledge 2003)

Edited books

- (with Katalin Farkas) Metaphysics: A Guide and Anthology (Oxford: Oxford University Press 2004)
- (with Sarah Patterson) History of the Mind-Body Problem (London: Routledge 2000)
- A Debate on Dispositions by D.M. Armstrong, C.B. Martin and U.T. Place (London: Routledge 1996)
- The Contents of Experience (Cambridge: Cambridge University Press 1992)
