= William Fleetwood =

English bishop

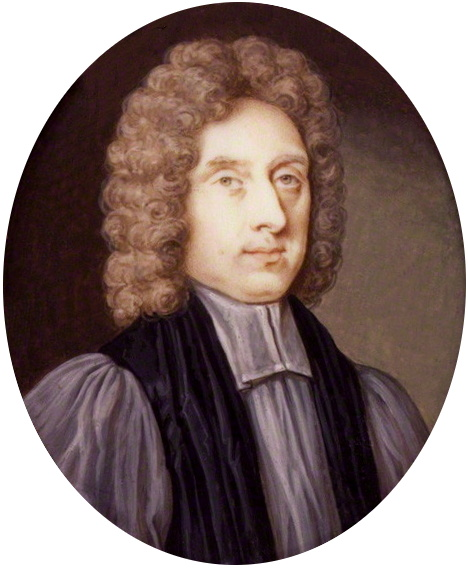
Bishop Fleetwood.

William Fleetwood (1 January 1656 – 4 August 1723) was an English preacher, Bishop of St Asaph and Bishop of Ely, remembered by economists and statisticians for constructing a price index in his Chronicon Preciosum of 1707.

== Life ==
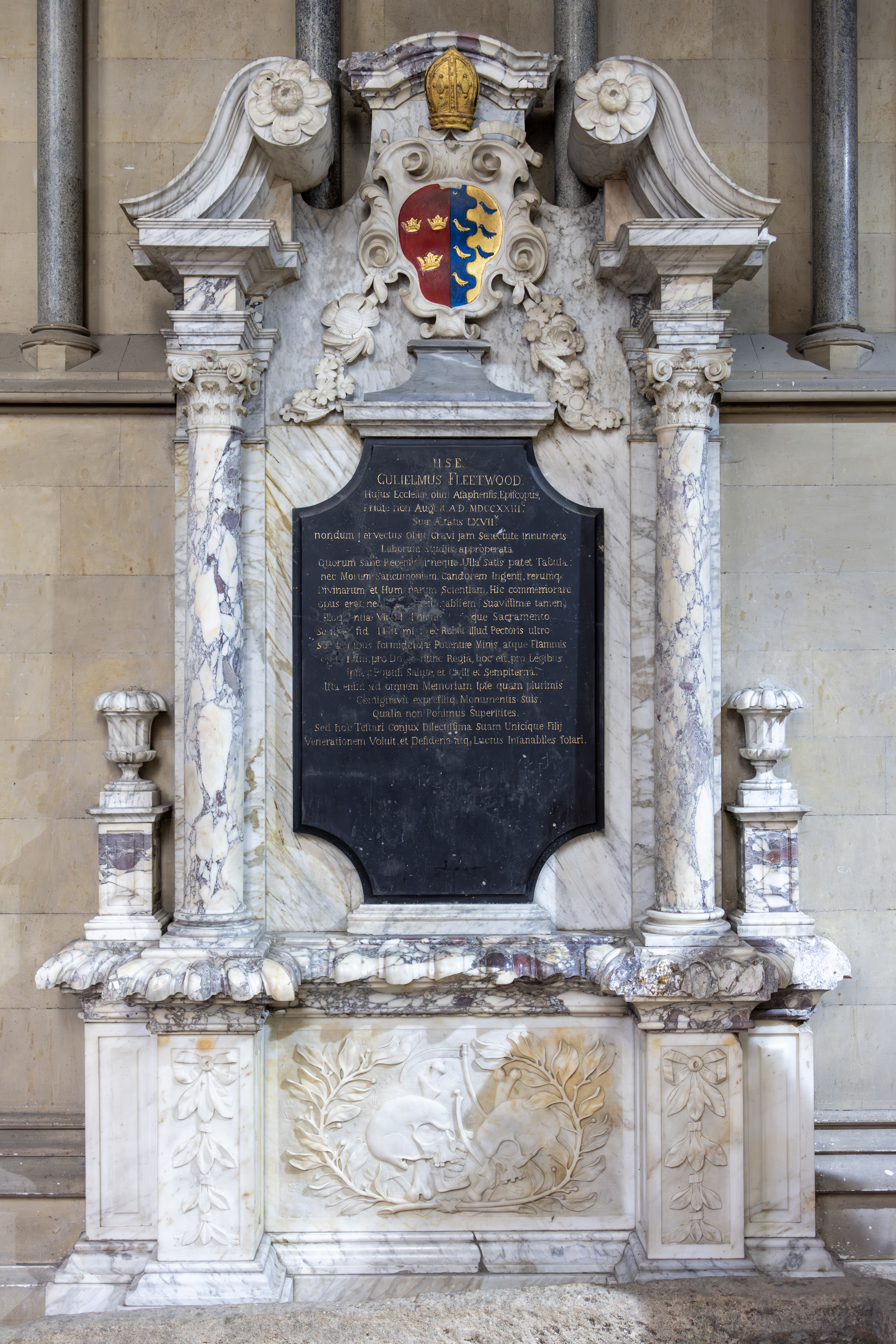
Memorial to Bishop William Fleetwood in Ely Cathedral

Fleetwood was descended of an ancient Lancashire family, and was born in the Tower of London on New Year's Day 1656. He received his education at Eton and at King's College, Cambridge. About the time of the Revolution he took orders, and was shortly afterwards made rector of St Austin's, London, and lecturer of St Dunstan's in the West. He became a canon of Windsor in 1702, and in 1708 he was nominated to the see of St Asaph, from which he was translated in 1714 to that of Ely. He died at Tottenham, Middlesex, on 4 August 1723.

Fleetwood was regarded as the best preacher of his time. He was accurate in learning, and effective in delivery, and his character stood deservedly high in general estimation. In episcopal administration he far excelled most of his contemporaries. He was a zealous Hanoverian, and a favourite with Queen Anne in spite of his Whiggism. In 1708, he preached a sermon before the queen at the national service of thanksgiving for victory at the Battle of Oudenarde His opposition to the doctrine of non-resistance brought him into conflict with the Tory ministry of 1712 and with Swift, but he never entered into personal controversy.

His principal writings are An Essay on Miracles (1701); Chronicum preciosum (an account of the English coinage, 1707); and Free Sermons (1712), containing discourses on the death of Queen Mary, the Duke of Gloucester and King William. The preface to this last was condemned to public burning by Parliament, but, as No. 384 of The Spectator, circulated more widely than ever. A collected edition of his works, with a biographical preface, was published in 1737. His memorial by monumental masons Edward Stanton (sculptor) and Christopher Horsnaile is in the north chancel aisle of Ely Cathedral.

== Chronicon Preciosum ==
In the (anonymously published) Chronicon Preciosum Fleetwood asked, how much would £5 in 1440 buy today? The question (the case) arose because a correspondent would lose the fellowship of an Oxford college if he had outside income in excess of £5; the college statute was composed in 1440. Fleetwood showed how much bread, drink, meat, cloth and books could be purchased at the earlier and later dates. He tabulated the changing prices of many commodities and noted that most of the prices grew at the same rate. He concluded that £5 in the fifteenth century would be worth £28 or £30 today, at the beginning of the eighteenth.

Adam Smith used some of Fleetwood's data in The Wealth of Nations (1776), but did not develop—or even adopt—the concept of comparing purchasing power at different dates. Admiration for Fleetwood's work and efforts to build on it only emerged in the nineteenth century. For Edgeworth the Chronicon Preciosum was "the oldest and one of the best treatises on index-numbers."

Fleetwood's sermons often dealt with subjects of economic interest. For example, his sermon against clipping (of gold coins), delivered before the Lord Mayor of London, explained the function of money and the "mischiefs of corrupting and debasing money." He published his sermon on paying debts during the South Sea panic.

Fleetwood seems to have been a practical Christian and, from the account of his life, a very political bishop.

== Economic writings ==
- A Sermon against Clipping (London, 1694)
- Chronicon Preciosum: or An Account of English Money, the Price of Corn and Other Commodities, for the Last 600 Years (London, 1707) The work appeared in his collected works of 1737 and was reissued in 1745 with a longer title and under the author's name.
- The Justice of Paying Debts (1718)

== Resources and external links ==
- Chronicon Preciosum from Paulette Taieb's site
- Portraits of William Fleetwood at the National Portrait Gallery, London
- Works of William Fleetwood

Church of England titles
Preceded by William Beveridge	Bishop of St Asaph; 1704–1708	Succeeded by John Wynne
Preceded by John Moore	Bishop of Ely; 1714–1723	Succeeded by Thomas Greene
