= Hallvard Lillehammer =

British-Norwegian academic and philosopher

Hallvard Lillehammer (born 1970) is a British philosopher who is a professor of philosophy at University of Sheffield. His research relates to the interpretation and criticism of basic ideas in moral and political thought, including reason, objectivity, impartiality, autonomy, responsibility and detachment. He formerly taught at Birkbeck College, University of London and at the Faculty of Philosophy, University of Cambridge, where he was a Fellow of King's College from 2000 to 2009 and a Senior Research Fellow of Churchill College from 2010 to 2013. He was educated at University College London and Peterhouse, Cambridge. Of Norwegian, German and Swedish descent, Lillehammer was born in Bergen and grew up in Stavanger, Norway.

== Selected publications ==
=== Books ===
- Companions in Guilt: Arguments for Ethical Objectivity. Palgrave Macmillan. 2007.

=== Edited volumes ===
- Real Metaphysics: Essays in Honour of D. H. Mellor. Edited with Gonzalo Rodriguez-Pereyra. Routledge. 2003.
- Ramsey's Legacy. Edited with David Hugh Mellor. Clarendon Press. 2005.
- The Trolley Problem. Cambridge University Press. 2023.

=== Articles ===
- ‘Smith on Moral Fetishism.’ Analysis 57:3, 187-95., 1997.
- 'Moral Realism, Normative Reasons and Rational Intelligibility', Erkenntnis, 2002.
- 'Debunking Morality: Evolutionary Naturalism and Moral Error Theory', Biology and Philosophy, 2003.
- 'Moral Error Theory', Proceedings of the Aristotelian Society, 2004.
- 'Methods of Ethics and the Descent of Man: Darwin and Sidgwick on Ethics and Evolution', Biology and Philosophy, 2010.
- ‘Who Is My Neighbour? Understanding Indifference as a Vice’, Philosophy, 2014.
- ‘Minding Your Own Business? Understanding Indifference as a Virtue’, Philosophical Perspectives, 2014.
- ‘Moral Testimony, Moral Virtue and the Value of Autonomy’, Proceedings of the Aristotelian Society, Supplementary Volume, 2014.
- 'The Nature and Ethics of Indifference', The Journal of Ethics, 2017.
- 'Moral Luck and Moral Performance', European Journal of Philosophy, 2020.
