= Worshipful Company of Masons =

Livery company of the City of London

Coordinates: 51.51174°N 0.09480°W

- Motto: God is our Guide
- Location: c/o Mercers' Hall, 6 Frederick's Place, London, EC2R 8AB
- Date of formation: 1376
- Company association: stone masonry
- Order of precedence: 30th
- Master of company: Matthew Hampson
- Website: www.masonslivery.org

The Worshipful Company of Masons is one of the ancient Livery Companies of the City of London, number 30 in the order of precedence of the 114 companies. It was granted Arms in 1472, during the reign of King Edward IV; its motto is “God Is Our Guide”. It is not affiliated with fraternal Freemasonry.

The Masons’ Company emerged in the late Middle Ages, and played an important role in medieval and early modern London. It regulated the craft of stonemasonry, for example by ensuring that standards and the training of apprentices were properly maintained, at first just in the City of London, but subsequently also in the City of Westminster and seven miles from each. It was also an important social organisation in the lives of its members. Like most Livery Companies, it maintains its social function, but the Company’s economic and administrative role has changed over time and it no longer oversees the craft in this traditional way, although it remains actively involved in supporting those training in stonemasonry and in promoting the use of natural stone. It remains one of the few Livery Companies today whose craft, particularly its tools, would be recognisable to its early members. Of all the ancient crafts used in Britain, masons have left the most impressive and most permanent evidence of their work. Members of the Company are known to have taken part in the construction of many of these famous structures, for example, the London Guildhall, and St Paul’s Cathedral.

== History ==
Although a ‘mistery’ (i.e. craft) of masons may have existed beforehand, the elections to the Common Council in 1376 provide the first secure evidence for the existence of an organised guild of masons in London, and by 1389, if not earlier, there was a fraternity of masons in London too, so the roots of the company were embedded at that time and developed during the following century into the company we would recognise today. By 1463, the Masons’ Hall was established near the Guildhall; the sale of the Company’s Hall was agreed in 1865, and a plaque now marks the place where the Hall stood in Masons’ Avenue. In 1472, the Company was granted armorial bearings, and in 1481 they ratified a set of ordinances before the Lord Mayor and Aldermen of London. At the behest of King James I, in 1609-10 the City livery companies were required to form associations to provide funds for use in the Ulster Plantation. Although this venture passed into history a long time ago, over 400 years later the Masons Company maintains its friendly relationships with the Mercers’, Cooks’ and Broderers’ companies that formed the Association at the time. In June 1675, Thomas Strong, a liveryman and subsequently Court Assistant of the Masons’ Company, laid the foundation stone of St. Paul’s Cathedral, and thirty-three years later, in 1708, his brother Edward Strong, a Past Master of the Company, laid the last stone on the lanthorn of the Cathedral. In 1677, the Company was formally incorporated by Royal Charter.

Moving forward to the twentieth Century, to mark the 500th anniversary of the Grant of Arms, in 1972, there was a new exemplification of the coat of arms by the College of Arms. The Natural Stone Craft Awards were presented by HRH The Duke of Gloucester (a Liveryman of the Company) for the first time in 1986. In 1990, The Company formed an Association with the Corps of Royal Engineers. 2004 saw the re-siting and restoration of Temple Bar to Paternoster Square, having been originally built by Master Masons’ Edward and Joshua Marshall in 1673.

== Membership ==
The Masons’ Company is currently limited to 250 Liverymen and 50 Freemen.

Yeoman Masons, a category of membership that was re-constituted in 2008, has no limit, but currently stands at over 60 members.

== Current activities / fellowship and social activities ==
The two key annual events are the Master’s Banquet, often at Mansion House in March and the Livery Dinner with the Associated Companies in November. The Company’s wide social programme involves talks and visits to places of historical and architectural interest throughout the year, along with various fellowship events.

The Company’s support for the craft of stonemasonry continues with the Duke of Gloucester Awards for Excellence in the Craft of Stonemasonry, which take the form of a Certificate and cash prize.

== Affiliations / organisations with which the Company has links ==
The Masons’ Company maintains direct contact with those involved in stonemasonry, training, the construction industry, and the City Civic. These include the Council of City and Guilds, the Cathedrals’ Workshop Fellowship, the Stone Federation of Great Britain, the Building Crafts College, the City and Guilds of London Art School, the Ironbridge Gorge Museum Trust, the Weald and Downland Living Museum, the Incorporation of Masons of Glasgow, and the Construction Livery Group representing 18 livery companies. In common with many other livery companies, the military is also well supported, including HMS Portland, 36 (Engineer) Regiment, No.14 Squadron RAF, Royal Regiment of Scotland and 15 Company, South West London Army Cadet Force.

== Charities ==
The Masons’ Company Charitable Trust and the Masons’ Company Craft Fund are the two independent charities which work in parallel with the Company.

The Craft Fund is primarily interested in fostering the craft of stonemasonry, focussing on those studying at a selection of recognised colleges across the country in addition to working with the Cathedrals’ Workshop Fellowship in the delivery of apprenticeships.

The Charitable Trust has a wider remit and provides funding for educational projects, donations to heritage and stone related projects and the City of London’s and Lord Mayor’s charitable projects.

== Arms ==
Coat of arms of Worshipful Company of Masons
Crest On a wreath Sable and Argent, A castle argent. Escutcheon Sable, on a chevron engrailed between three castles argent, garnished with doors and windows of the field, a pair of compasses extended also sable. Motto God is our guide.
