= John Matthews (soda water manufacturer) =

Inventor and manufacturer (1808–1870)

John Matthews (1808–1870) was an English-born American inventor and soda water manufacturer. He is known as "The Soda Fountain King".

Matthews manufactured carbonating machinery and distributed his product through retail stores. The equipment was a lead-lined cast-iron box where carbonic acid gas was formed by mixing sulfuric acid with marble dust. The gas was then purified by passing it through water, and then into a tank partially filled with cool water. The tank was rocked for a quarter to a half hour, until the water was impregnated and bubbly.

Matthews created a fountain apparatus that could be positioned on a pharmacist's counter to dispense carbonated drinks, leading to its popularization and rapid growth.

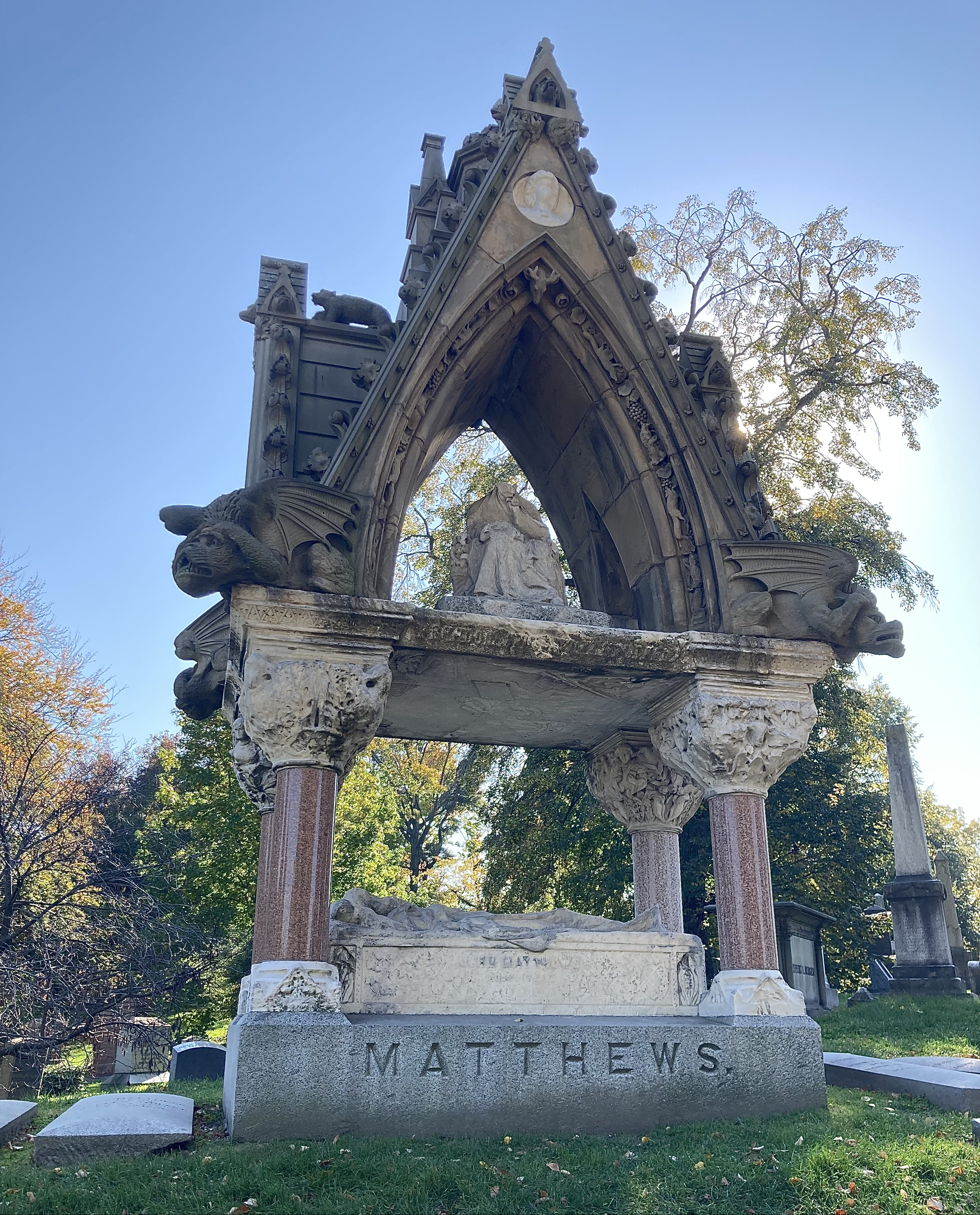
The John Matthews Monument at Green-Wood Cemetery, Brooklyn, New York.

He is buried at Green-Wood Cemetery, Brooklyn, New York. His monument was designed by Karl Muller and cost $30,000. When it rains, excess water drains from the gargoyles' mouths.

== See also ==
- Soda fountain
