= Green-Wood Cemetery =

Cemetery in Brooklyn, New York

- U.S. National Register of Historic Places
- U.S. National Historic Landmark District
- New York State Register of Historic Places
- New York City Landmark
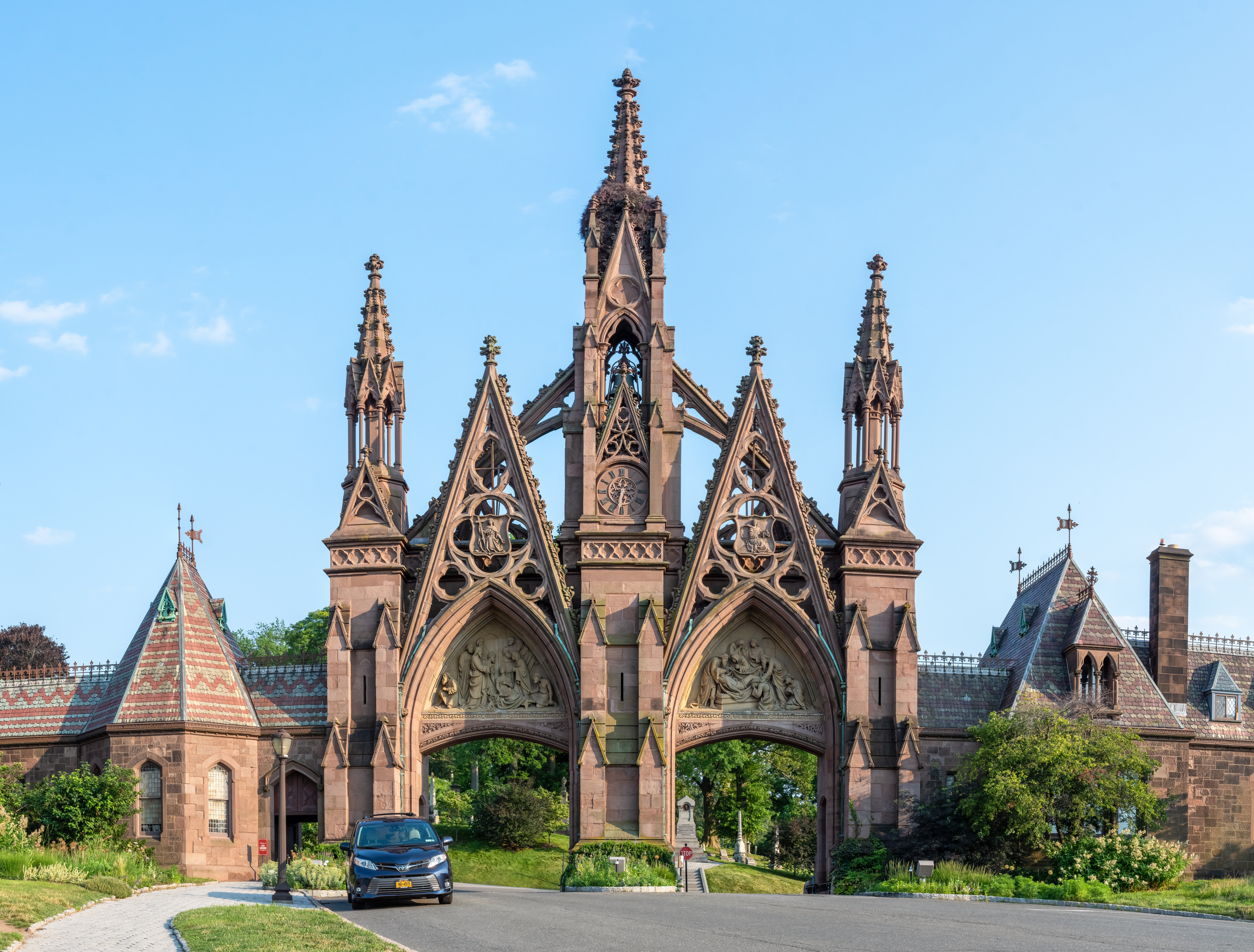
- The Gothic Revival entrance to the cemetery at 25th Street, designed by Richard M. Upjohn

- Location within New York City Location within New York Location within the United States
- Interactive map of Green-Wood Cemetery
- Location: 500 25th Street, Brooklyn, New York, U.S.
- Coordinates: 40°39′09″N 73°59′28″W
- Area: 478 acres (193 ha)
- Built: 1838
- Architects: Cemetery: David Bates Douglass; Gates: Richard M. Upjohn; Chapel: Warren & Wetmore; Weir Greenhouse: G. Curtis Gillespie
- NRHP reference No.: 97000228
- NYSRHP No.: 04701.000019
- NYCL No.: 0149, 1197, 1233

Significant dates
- Added to NRHP: March 8, 1997 (Note: These designation dates apply only to the cemetery itself. Weir Greenhouse is covered by a separate NRHP and state landmark designation.)
- Designated NHLD: September 20, 2006
- Designated NYSRHP: August 8, 1983
- Designated NYCL: Gates: April 19, 1966; Weir Greenhouse: April 13, 1982; Fort Hamilton Parkway Gate & Green-Wood Cemetery Chapel: April 12, 2016

Green-Wood Cemetery is a 478-acre (193 ha) cemetery in western Brooklyn, New York City, United States. Founded in 1838 as a rural cemetery, it has 570,000 interments as of 2024, including many politicians, soldiers, artists, and business figures. The cemetery occupies a site with varied topography created by glacial moraines, particularly the Harbor Hill Moraine. The landscape design by David Bates Douglass incorporates rolling hills and lakes, including Brooklyn's highest natural point at Battle Hill. Green-Wood also includes four gates and several shelters designed by Richard Upjohn and a chapel designed by Warren and Wetmore. There are elaborate monuments to some of the dead.

Green-Wood Cemetery was established at a time of rapid urbanization when churchyards in the then-separate cities of Brooklyn and New York City were becoming overcrowded. Described as "Brooklyn's first public park by default long before Prospect Park was created", Green-Wood Cemetery was so popular that it inspired competitions to design nearby parks. The cemetery had reached its final size by 1863, though landscaping and building construction continued through the 19th century. More facilities were added during the 20th century, including a new receiving tomb in 1909, a chapel in 1913, and a crematorium in the 1950s. The cemetery was nearing capacity by the 1990s, prompting its operators to begin hosting events such as concerts and tours to attract visitors.

Green-Wood Cemetery is a nonprofit cemetery and conducts burials and cremations. The cemetery is open for public visitation and hosts hundreds of annual events. The Green-Wood Historic Fund, a 501(c)(3) nonprofit institution, helps organize preservation and programs. Over the years, there has been commentary on Green-Wood's bucolic nature. The cemetery is listed on the National Register of Historic Places as a National Historic Landmark District, and two of its gates, its visitor center at the Weir Greenhouse, and its chapel are New York City designated landmarks.

== Description ==
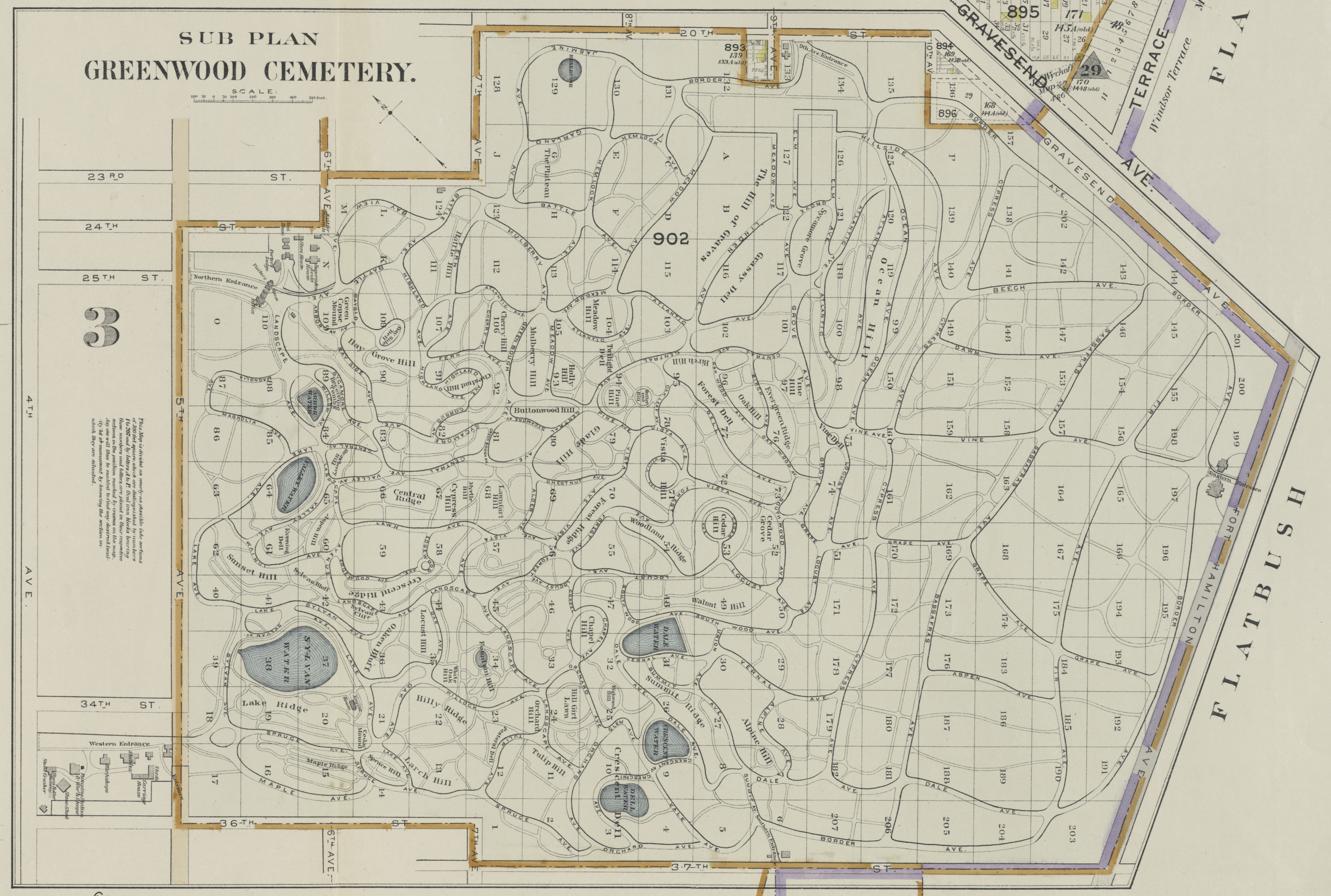
An 1899 map of the cemetery

Green-Wood Cemetery is a nonsectarian cemetery occupying 478 acres (193 ha) in western Brooklyn within what is now New York City, United States. Its boundaries include, among other streets, 20th Street to the northeast, Fifth Avenue to the northwest, 36th and 37th Streets to the southwest, Fort Hamilton Parkway to the south, and McDonald Avenue to the east. The cemetery is bounded on all sides by urban development, including industrial shops, apartment buildings, and houses. The neighborhood of Greenwood Heights abuts the cemetery to the northwest and north. Other neighborhoods near Green-Wood Cemetery include Sunset Park to the southwest, Park Slope to the northeast, Windsor Terrace to the east, and Kensington to the south. Green-Wood was inspired by Père Lachaise Cemetery in Paris, which at the time retained the primarily axial formality of Alexandre Théodore Brongniart's original design, and by Mount Auburn Cemetery in Cambridge, Massachusetts, where a cemetery in a naturalistic park-like landscape in the English manner was first established.

=== Landscaping and circulation ===
David Bates Douglass, Green-Wood's landscape architect, mostly kept the cemetery's natural landscaping intact. The cemetery has been expanded several times; most of these regions have been landscaped to resemble the original plot. The area along Fort Hamilton Parkway to the south, which was acquired last, is known as the flats. The flats have more gently curving paths and roads compared with the rest of the cemetery. Green-Wood's National Historic Landmark (NHL) designation report divides the grounds into three geological sections: Douglass's original landscape to the north and center; the flats to the south; and even newer areas created through subsequent infilling of landscape features. An elaborate iron fence surrounds the cemetery.

The site is characterized by varied topography created by glacial moraines, particularly the Harbor Hill Moraine. The geology of the landscape includes glacial till, which is highly varied in composition. The landscape includes rolling hills and dales along with several ponds. Many of the landscape features are named after terms that evoke a naturalistic scene, such as Camellia Path, Halcyon Lake, Oaken Bluff, Sylvan Cliff, and Vista Hill. Among the cemetery's natural features is Battle Hill (a.k.a. Gowan's Heights), the highest point in Brooklyn at approximately 216 feet (66 m) above sea level; the hill is named after a skirmish that took place there on August 27, 1776, during the Battle of Long Island. Visible from the cemetery's high topography are locales such as the Statue of Liberty (within New York Harbor) and New Jersey to the west, Manhattan to the north, Jamaica Bay and the Rockaways to the east, and Coney Island and Staten Island to the south.

The cemetery is commonly cited as having 7,000 trees, though news articles from 1954 described Green-Wood as containing 30,000 trees. Plaques on these trees, and on "memorial benches" throughout the grounds, can be purchased by families of the deceased. A New York Daily News article from 1999 cited the cemetery as having 65,000 plantings, including both shrubs and trees. The landscape also includes over 150 fungus species.

Douglass laid out the road and path systems, namely 59 avenues, 4 formal walks, and 180 walkways. The roads are variously cited as stretching about 12 miles (19 km), 20 miles (32 km) or 22 miles (35 km). The footpaths extend approximately 17 miles (27 km) or 40 miles (64 km). Originally, the roads were paved in gravel and loose stone, and several of the roads formed a serpentine route called "The Tour", which passed by the major mausoleums. Much of Douglass's plan is still in place with its original plantings and curving-road systems. The original street names and cast-iron perimeter fence have been retained, but many of the roads have been paved in asphalt. Other roads and paths have been removed to make way for gravesites. Though vehicles are allowed on the cemetery's roads, bicycles are generally banned, aside from special events such as tours and races. Between 34th and 36th streets, a stone bridge (dating from 1860) carries Fifth Avenue above cemetery grounds.

=== Graves ===
As of 2024, Green-Wood Cemetery contains 570,000 gravesites, which are referred to as in-ground burial sites. There are multiple types of graves, including single and double graves. Approximately a third of the interments are in parcels with one grave, or in public lots around the cemetery's perimeter. Tombstones in these lots tended not to be anchored to the ground. Farther inside the cemetery are private tracts with multiple graves, which tend to be more expensive than single-grave sites and public lots. Private tracts, both for single and multiple burials, can be individually consecrated if that process is required for the deceased's faith. Several family members may be buried atop each other in three tiers up to 9 feet (2.7 m) deep. At these locations, up to six decedents (three cremated and three buried) may be stacked in a single plot. Green-Wood also allows green burials throughout its grounds (see Green-Wood Cemetery § Operations), many of which are concentrated in a tract called Cedar Dell.

When the cemetery opened, parcels measured 14 by 27 feet (4.3 by 8.2 m) across; this comprised a 12-by-25-foot (3.7 m × 7.6 m) area for the grave itself and a 1-foot-wide (0.30 m) buffer on all sides for the installation of protective enclosures. These enclosures, which included fences and rails, were gradually removed in the 20th century. Later parcels are significantly smaller, at 9 by 4 feet (2.7 by 1.2 m) across. Groups such as churches could be allocated specific plots for their members. Parcels could be reclaimed by the cemetery if they have not been used for an interment for 75 years. As of 2025, the costs of single graves started at over $20,000, while mausoleums were significantly more expensive. As at other New York state cemeteries, 10% of interments' cost is put into a maintenance fund for the cemetery.

Gravediggers oversee at least one new interment daily as of 2025; they mostly use mechanical equipment to dig graves, but children's graves or parcels in constrained sites are still dug by hand. Due to the cemetery's variable geology, gravediggers are required to undergo a 40-day trial period before being hired, and they must be physically able to dig out a 3-by-8-by-5-foot (0.91 m × 2.44 m × 1.52 m) grave by hand within four hours. By the 21st century, there was a small number of gravediggers, owing to decreases in both the number of burials and the area available for new burials. Bodies are seldom disinterred due to the difficulty of doing so.

==== Mass graves ====
There are several mass graves and communal burial sites at Green-Wood, where tens to hundreds of people may be buried. Among these are the Freedom Lots, seven parcels at the cemetery's southwest corner where the remains of 1,300 African Americans are interred. Also at Green-Wood is a mass grave for 103 unidentified victims of the 1876 Brooklyn Theatre fire; this site, leased by the New York City government, has a 30-foot-tall (9.1 m) obelisk. The cemetery contains a common grave with the unidentified remains of victims of the 1960 New York mid-air collision, adjacent to a memorial for the victims. Another grave contains some unidentified remains relocated from Washington Square Park in Manhattan. There is also a soldiers' lot, which houses the remains of 1,000 American Civil War soldiers relocated from elsewhere in the cemetery.

=== Memorials ===
The New Yorker wrote in 2025 that the cemetery had about a quarter-million memorial structures, including about 500 mausoleums in addition to smaller graveside monuments. The cemetery's 2006 NHL designation report cites the grounds as having 106,000 memorials, including 790 mausoleums. Another source from 1999 cites figures of 10 shared "community mausoleums", along with 650 privately-built mausoleums. The community mausoleums are subdivided into crypts of multiple sizes. Graves and associated memorial structures are generally maintained by families of decedents. Historically, if families failed to keep graves and memorials clean, they received warnings from cemetery officials, but by the 21st century, people could sponsor strangers' monuments.

Monuments and mausoleums in the cemetery are designed in several styles, including the Victorian, Classical, Egyptian, Gothic, and Romanesque. Monuments fall into four categories: those honoring events or professions; those with architectural significance; those whose graves contain people of historical significance; and "monuments of sculptural interest". The Brooklyn Eagle wrote in 1896 that many graveside memorials had design features such as gold lettering and elaborate plaques. Memorials use materials such as bronze, brownstone, cast zinc, granite, limestone, marble, terracotta, and yellow sandstone. Many memorials—and other structures in the cemetery—carry decorative elements with Christian iconography or motifs alluding to the United States' growth as a relatively young country. Frequently used motifs include angels, baseballs, clasped hands, empty beds, hourglasses, horses, and owls, alongs stained glass windows.

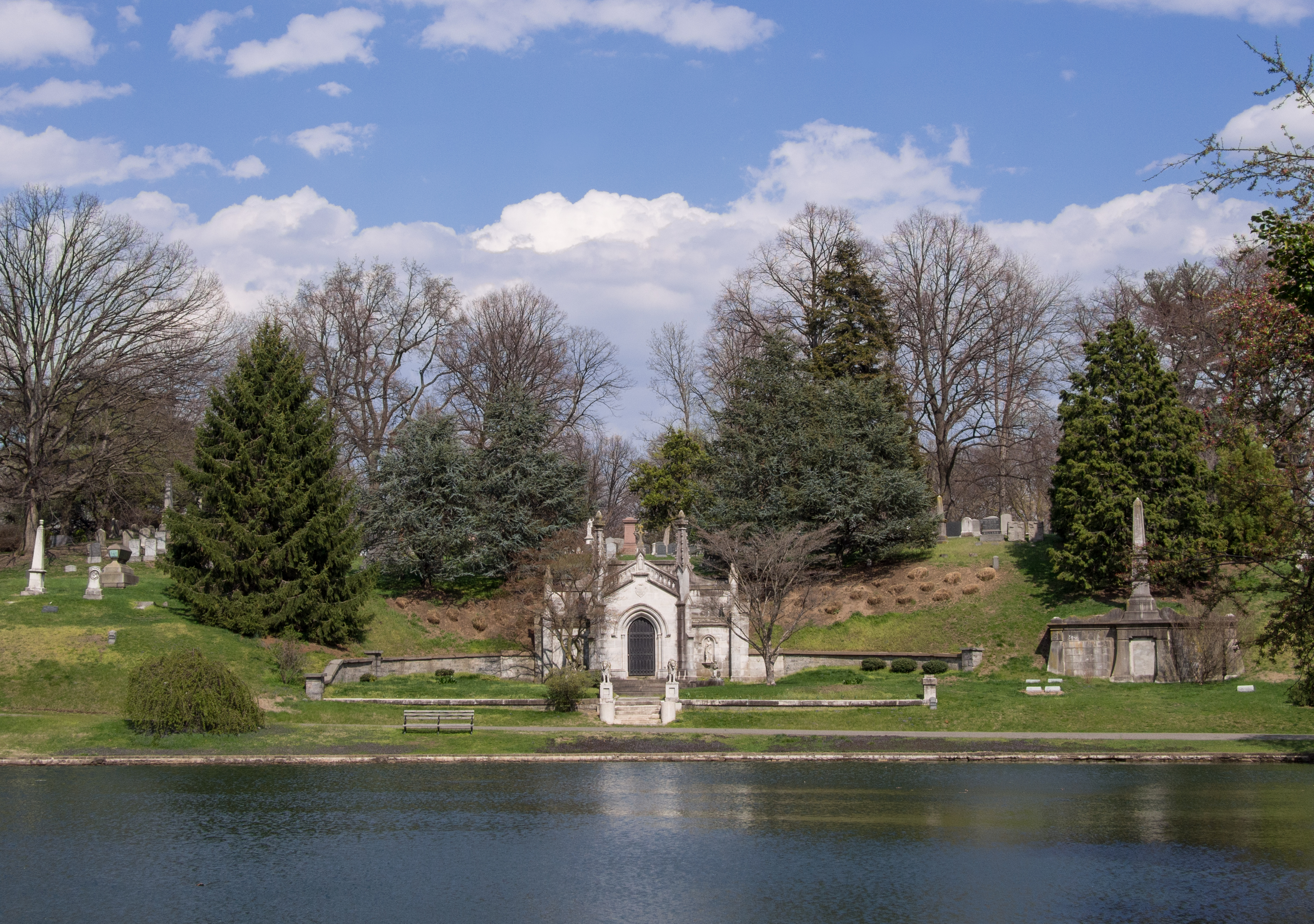
William Niblo mausoleum

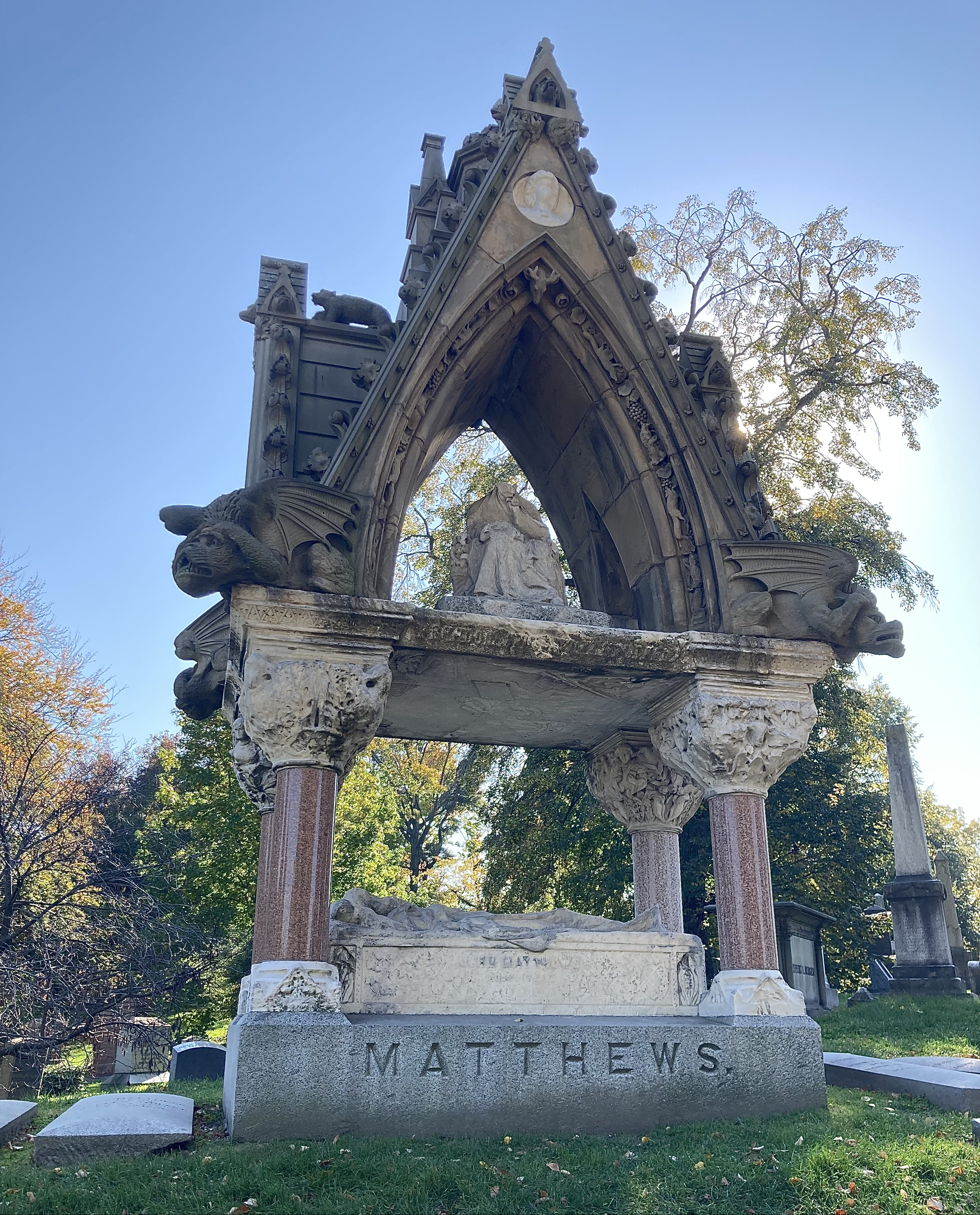
John Matthews monument

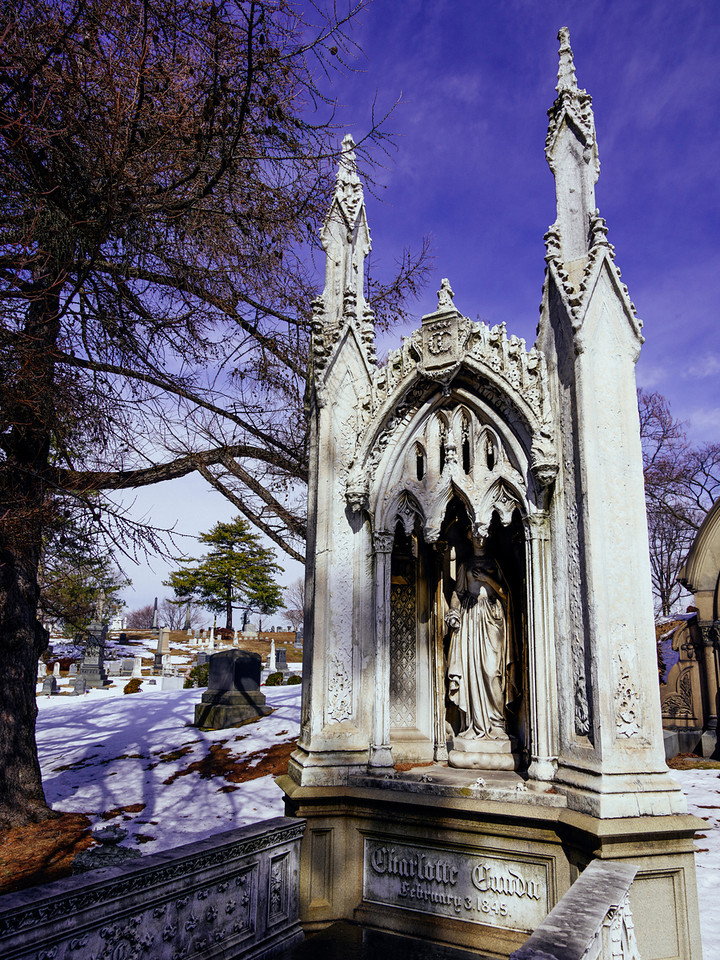
Charlotte Canda monument

==== Mausoleums ====
Green-Wood's more elaborate mausoleums include William Niblo's Grand Gothic mausoleum, Abiel Abbot Low's tomb, and the Lispenard family's Norman-style mausoleum. The Steinway family's mausoleum, designed in a classical style, can fit 136 bodies. A mausoleum for restaurateur Charles Feltman is designed in the style of a temple. Another mausoleum, built in granite for John William Mackay, has its own chapel and a heating system. A granite mausoleum, near 39th Street, was erected by US congressman Henry C. Miner for his family. The cemetery has a small number of white bronze mausoleums, though these were no longer manufactured after World War I and were subjects of vandalism.

Numerous mausoleums were designed by popular contemporary architects, including Minard Lafever, Warren and Wetmore, Richard Upjohn, and Griffith Thomas. For instance, Thomas designed a mausoleum for San Francisco mayor C. K. Garrison in the Moorish Revival style. Stanford White designed a mausoleum for the family of arts patron Isabella Stewart, whose infant son is buried there; this mausoleum contains sculpture by Augustus Saint-Gaudens. Henry Evelyn Pierrepont, the merchant who cofounded Green-Wood Cemetery, is buried in a mausoleum designed by Upjohn on one of Green-Wood's few manmade hills. At Prospect Park West and 20th Street, Carrère and Hastings designed a square mausoleum, which measured 350 feet (110 m) on each side and could fit urns for 30,000 people.

===== Monuments =====
The cemetery includes other monuments besides the mausoleums. Among the oldest is a statue of DeWitt Clinton, built in 1853. There is a High Victorian pier designed by William or Edward Potter for their relatives; a monument depicting housewife Jane Griffith waving goodbye to her husband on the day of her sudden death; and a statue called Angel of Music atop the tomb of musician Louis Moreau Gottschalk. On the east side of the cemetery is the Sylvanus U. Reynolds and Matilda Ross monument, depicting a woman on a bathtub-shaped sarcophagus. Another monument honors six members of the Brown family lost in the SS Arctic disaster of 1854; this incorporates a sculpture of the ship, half-submerged by the waves. A terracotta-and-marble monument, built for soda water manufacturer John Matthews, has gargoyles that function as gutters. The monument of 17-year-old debutante Charlotte Canda, designed in the Gothic style based on one of Canda's own designs, was among the cemetery's most popular memorials in the mid-19th century. Other monuments to specific people include the Pilots' Monument and the Sea Captain's Monument, each dedicated to a notable person in these respective professions.

In 1868–1876, after the Civil War ended, the 35-foot-tall (11 m) Civil War Soldiers' Monument was erected at the highest point in Green-Wood. A Revolutionary War monument by Frederick Ruckstull, Altar to Liberty: Minerva, was erected at the cemetery's highest point in 1919, facing the Statue of Liberty across New York Harbor. A statue of gynecologist J. Marion Sims by Ferdinand Freiherr von Miller, is also installed in Green-Wood, having been relocated from Manhattan. The statue The Triumph of Civic Virtue by Frederick MacMonnies, which has been at Green-Wood since 2013. There are monuments to several firefighters and a monument for the victims of the September 11 attacks, of whom more than 100 are buried at Green-Wood. Following the onset of the COVID-19 pandemic in 2020, the cemetery also erected annual COVID-19 monuments.

Other notable figures' monuments are simple in design, such as the tombs of Samuel Morse, William M. Tweed, Lola Montez, Henry Ward Beecher, and Currier and Ives. A group of simple black markers were built for the family of Louis Comfort Tiffany. Monuments to 19th-century children are also prevalent.

=== Buildings and structures ===
==== Gates ====
Main entrance gate at 25th Street

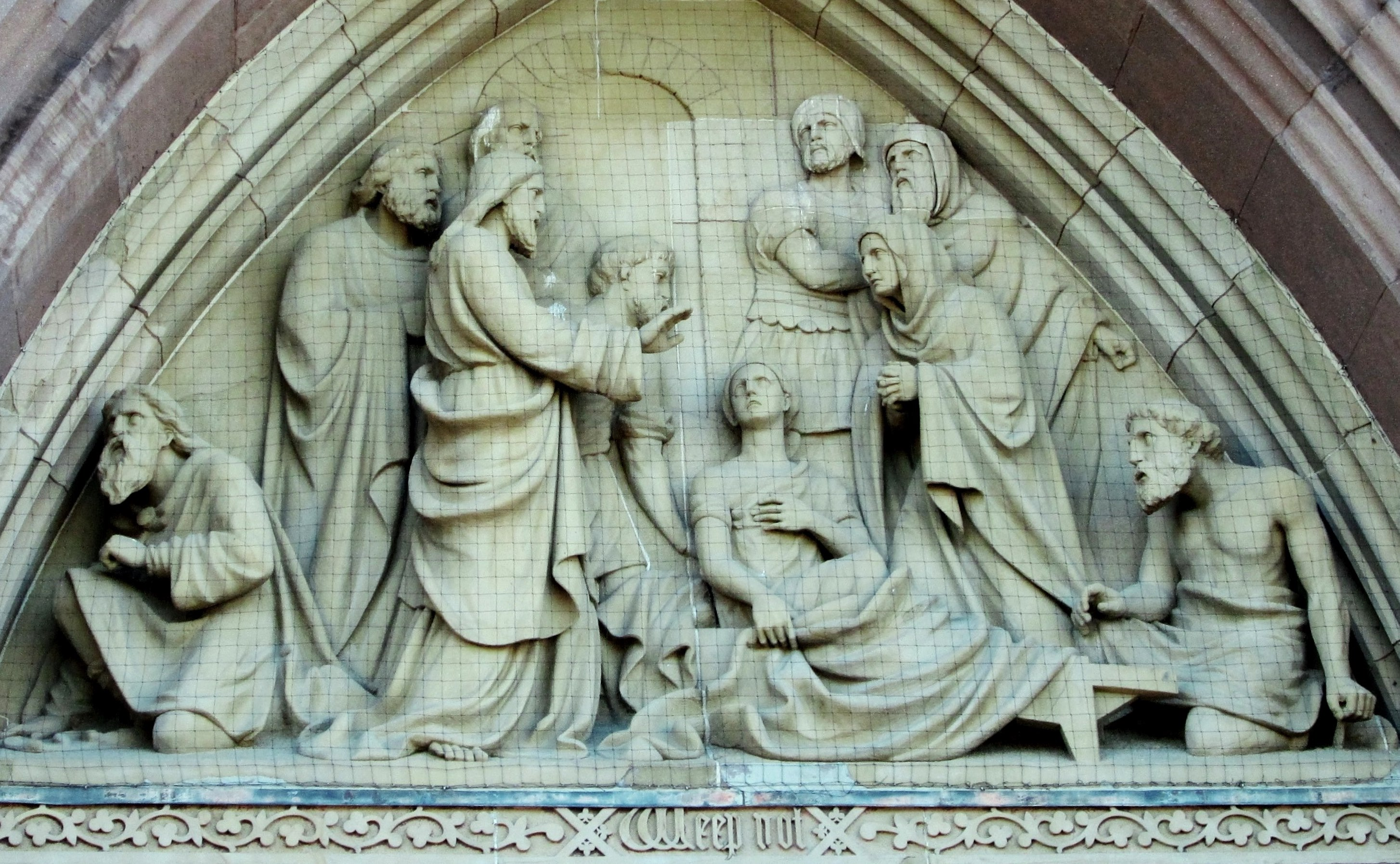
"Weep Not", one of John Moffitt's sculpted panels

A monk parakeet colony at the main gate

The cemetery has four gates. Two are city landmarks: the main gate at 25th Street to the northwest, which is closest to Greenwood Heights, and Fort Hamilton Parkway to the south, which is in Kensington. The gates were all developed from the 1840s to the 1860s. In general, the gatehouses are made of brownstone and yellow sandstone, with copper and slate-shingle roofs.

The main entrance, a double-arched Gothic Revival gate at 25th Street and Fifth Avenue near Green-Wood's northwestern corner, was designed by Upjohn and built in 1861–1863; the entrance itself opened in 1862. It is composed of Belleville, New Jersey, brownstone. The sculptured groups on Nova Scotia limestone panels over the gateways—depicting biblical scenes of death and resurrection from the New Testament, including Lazarus, The Widow's Son, and Jesus' Resurrection—are by John M. Moffitt. In between the two gateways is a clock tower in the Flamboyant style, which measures 100 feet (30 m) or 106 feet (32 m) tall. The words "The Dead Shall Be Raised" are carved into the gateway. A cemetery office is to one side of the gate, while the chapel and reception room are on the opposite side. A colony of monk parakeets, which are believed to have escaped their containers while in transit, nests in the spires of the gate. The New York Community Trust placed a Designated Landmarks of New York plaque on the gate in 1958.

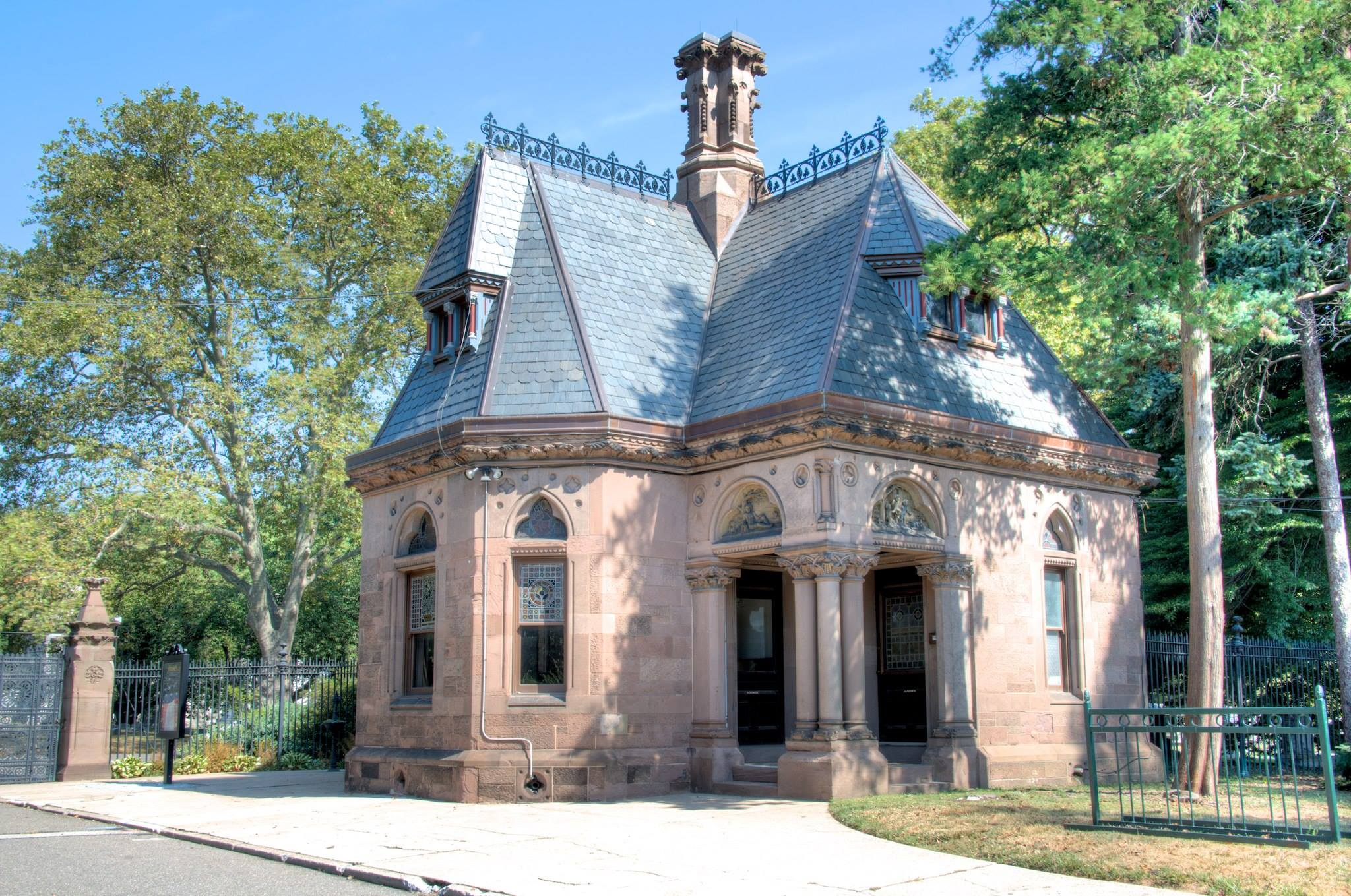
The visitor building at the cemetery's Fort Hamilton entrance

The Fort Hamilton gate, also designed by Upjohn, is located at Fort Hamilton Parkway and Micieli Place. Similar to the 25th Street gate, it is a double gateway made of brownstone. It is also flanked by two structures, a visitor's lounge and the gatekeeper's residence. The gate was built between 1876 and 1887. The visitor's lounge, a 1 1/2-story structure, is east of the gate. It has a central entrance, two side bays with porches, restrooms for men and women, and a sloping hip roof made of gray slate with metal ornamentation and dormers. The west side of the entrance contains the gatekeeper's residence, a brownstone structure consisting of a 3 1/2-story central tower and two shorter pavilions, which is similar in design to the visitor's lounge. Both pavilions have gray slate roofs, and the building includes various windows and doorway entrances; the roof of the central tower contains a stone chimney.

A Gothic Revival gate, designed by Warren and Wetmore, is located at Prospect Park West (Ninth Avenue) and 20th Street, to the northeast. It consists of a single-story gatehouse to the west and a two-story gatekeeper's residence to the east. A fourth gate, at 34th Street and Fourth Avenue, provides access from the southwest and is located next to Sunset Park and the 36th Street station of the New York City Subway, serving the D, N, and R trains. A fifth gate at Ninth Avenue and 37th Street, to the southwest, has since been removed.

==== Chapel ====
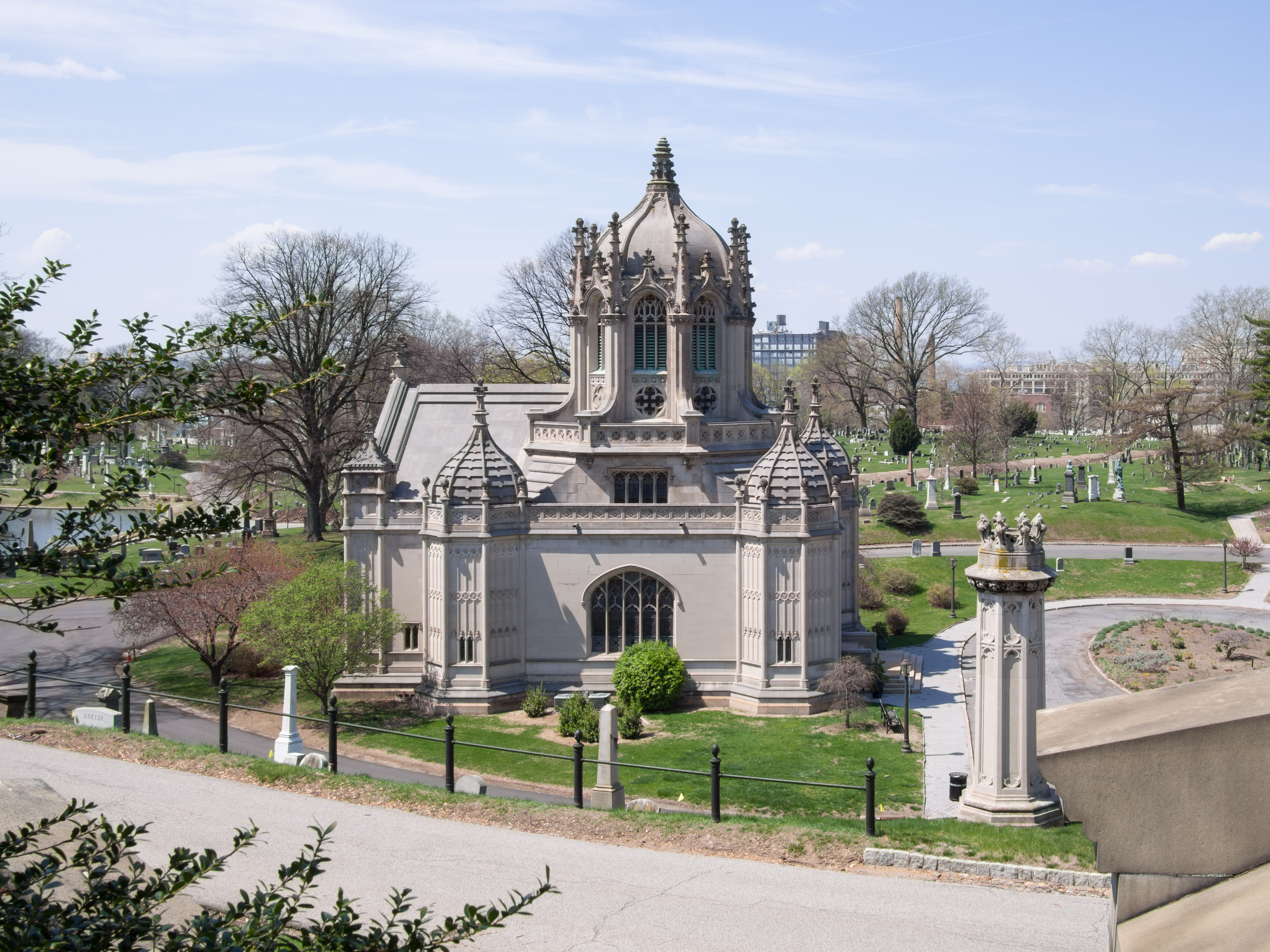
A side view of the chapel at the cemetery

The Green-Wood Cemetery chapel, designed by Warren and Wetmore, occupies the site of one of Green-Wood's original ponds. The chapel is located near the 25th Street gate, near the cemetery's receiving tomb. Though it is generally designed in the Neo-Gothic or late Gothic style, its massing is in the Beaux-Arts style. It was patterned after the Tom Tower at Christ Church, Oxford. The chapel, an interdenominational house of worship, was made a city landmark in 2016.

The chapel is clad with limestone sourced from a quarry in Bedford, Indiana. The exterior consists of multiple towers, including a central, domed octagonal tower and octagonal turrets at each corner. From ground level to the pinnacle of the dome, the chapel measures about 88 feet (27 m) high. Inside are three stories: a ground level, a clerestory level, and a second story in the central tower. The chapel has a rectangular chancel with space for 100 people. The chancel has marble floors with mosaic borders, a marble altar, quartered-oak cabinetry and sacristy, stained glass windows depicting various Biblical scenes, and a stone vaulted ceiling.

==== Other structures ====
Several wooden shelters were built on the grounds, including one in a Gothic Revival style, one resembling an Italian villa, and another resembling a Swiss chalet. These shelters, designed by Richard Upjohn, had largely deteriorated by the late 20th century except for a ladies' shelter.

The cemetery also has a receiving tomb for corpses needing interment. The original receiving tomb was built in 1853 and was designed by Upjohn. The receiving tomb, rebuilt in 1909, is located at Willow and Sycamore avenues near the cemetery's entrance, adjacent to the chapel. It measures 132 by 56 feet (40 by 17 m) and has a freestone entrance porch, which leads to a 46-by-25-foot (14.0 by 7.6 m) entrance hall. Inside is a crypt called the catacombs, which is built into the hillside, partially above ground, which is hidden beneath an earthen mound. There are skylights in the ground just above the crypt. Originally, the crypt had 361 compartments for coffins. The receiving tomb also had a columbarium with space for 340 funerary urns; the columbarium was used for cremation.

A purpose-built crematorium with an attached columbarium was built in the 1950s and functions as an interdenominational facility. The crematorium, designed by Eldredge Snyder and located near 5th Avenue and 25th Street, is one story high (with a basement) and measures 120 by 75 feet (37 by 23 m) across. The columbarium has a ceiling with motifs of a blue sky and clouds, and it had a 1950s-era time capsule with books about the cemetery's history, which was removed in 2013. Green-Wood Cemetery also has an executive office building dating from the 1990s. The executive office building, spanning 6,000 square feet (560 m^{2}), is adjacent to the cemetery's crematorium and is illuminated by blue transom windows.

The Hillside Mausoleum, one of the community mausoleums, is a utilitarian structure near Ocean Hill. The adjacent Hillside Mausoleum addition, designed by Platt Byard Dovell White, is an above-ground building spanning 8,000 square feet (740 m^{2}). It is variously cited as four or five stories high, and has space for 3,800 urns and 2,300 coffins. The Hillside Mausoleum annex is designed in a modernist style with a glass facade resembling waterfalls, as well as a roof terrace abutting Ocean Hill. Inside are lavish decorations such as ipe wood stairs, anigre niches, flute-glass vigil lights, and brass bud vases. There are also two waterfalls in the mausoleum annex, which are five stories high and use recirculating water.

== History ==
=== Founding ===
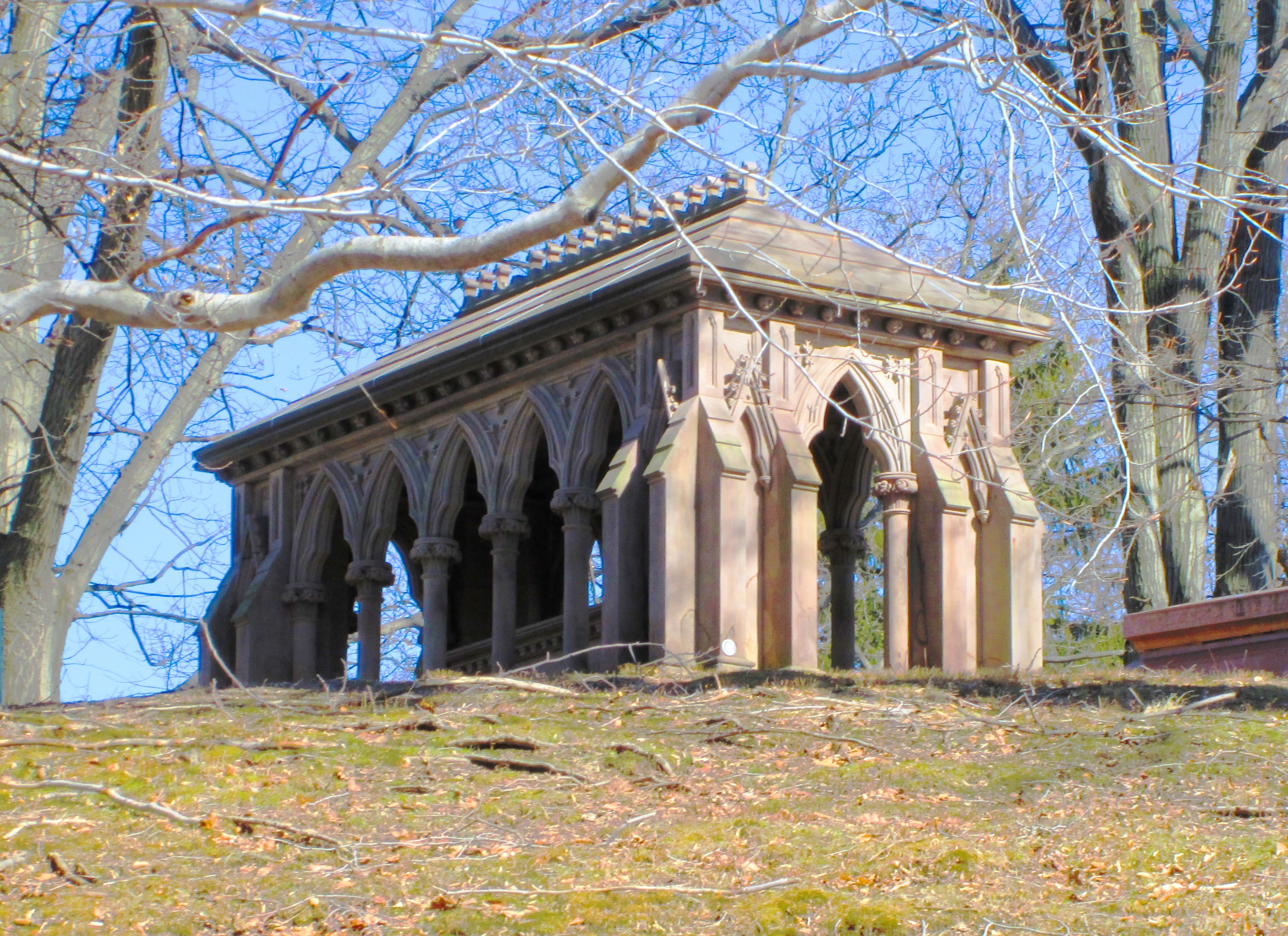
The mausoleum of the family of Henry Evelyn Pierrepont, a founder of the cemetery

By the early 1830s, ten thousand people a year were being buried in the adjacent, then-separate cities of New York City and Brooklyn. Most burials in the two cities took place in churchyards, which were both highly sought for their real estate value and blamed for disease outbreaks; New York City had banned churchyard burials after 1822. The idea for Green-Wood Cemetery, created by Brooklyn social leader Henry Evelyn Pierrepont and engineer David Bates Douglass, is directly derived from the creation of Mount Auburn Cemetery in Cambridge, Massachusetts, in 1831. After visiting Mount Auburn, Pierrepont decided to build a cemetery in Brooklyn in 1832, deciding on a hilly area east of Gowanus Bay. He initially wanted the Berry and Van Brunt farms, north of where Green-Wood was eventually built, but the owners refused to sell. In 1835, Pierrepont attended a lecture given by Douglass, suggesting that they build a rural cemetery with an astronomical observatory.

Initially, Douglass and Pierrepont wanted to call the cemetery "Necropolis" (city of the dead) before settling on the name "Greenwood Cemetery". The name was chosen because it elicited "verdure, shade, ruralness, natural beauty", in contrast with the urban development of Brooklyn. Acts of incorporation for Greenwood Cemetery were passed on April 18, 1838, entitling the corporation to a capital of $300,000 and a tract of 200 acres (81 ha). Nine men were named as the cemetery's commissioners. Douglass started working on the layout that year; at the time, the site included six kettle ponds, along with farmland and trees. On April 11, 1839, a modification to that act was enacted, changing the Greenwood corporation to a nonprofit organization.

Land was acquired from the Bennett, Bergen, and Wyckoff families, who had owned the plots since the Dutch colonization of New Netherland in the 17th century; they were compensated $668 per acre ($1,650/ha) on average. Construction started in May 1839, and Greenwood adopted a set of rules for visitors that year. The first recorded interment, that of Sarah Hanna, was performed on September 5, 1840. Before long, Greenwood Cemetery's name was hyphenated as Green-Wood. Sources disagree on whether the hyphenated form was used from the outset or after 1842. Newspapers omitted the hyphen so frequently that the spelling "Greenwood" became predominant; copyeditors in some newsrooms changed instances of "Green-Wood" back to "Greenwood".

=== Mid- and late 19th century ===
==== 1840s: Early years ====
Douglass worked on the project until he resigned in 1841. The cemetery commissioners decided to enclose the site with a long picket fence, which was installed in 1842. Originally, the fence enclosed 175 acres (71 ha), stretching between 21st and 37th Streets from 5th to 9th Avenue. Approximately 5 miles (8 km) of roads were paved inside Green-Wood to showcase its natural scenery. The earliest map dating from 1846 indicates that there were originally three ponds: Sylvan Water, Green-Isle Water, and Arbor Water, all on the western side of the modern cemetery. These ponds were adapted from kettle ponds that already existed on the site. The cemetery also had various shrubs, trees, ivies, and perennials, which attracted migratory birds.

Green-Wood charged $100 (equivalent to $3,000 in 2025) for a 14-by-27-foot (4.3 by 8.2 m) parcel, which provided enough space for 18 to 36 bodies. There were originally very few burials per year. By 1843, there had been 352 burials total, though the number of burials doubled just in the next year. Throughout the 1840s, several churches were allocated plots in Green-Wood Cemetery. These included the Dutch Protestant Reformed, Episcopal, Presbyterian, Unitarian, and German Lutheran churches of Brooklyn. Henry E. Pierrepont also acquired eight burial plots for himself and his family. The first expansion of the burial ground took place in 1844, when the cemetery acquired 9 acres (3.6 ha). In either 1845 or 1847, the cemetery's commissioners acquired approximately 65 acres (26 ha). The new tract was at the southwest corner of the cemetery, adjacent to the contemporary border of the city of Brooklyn.

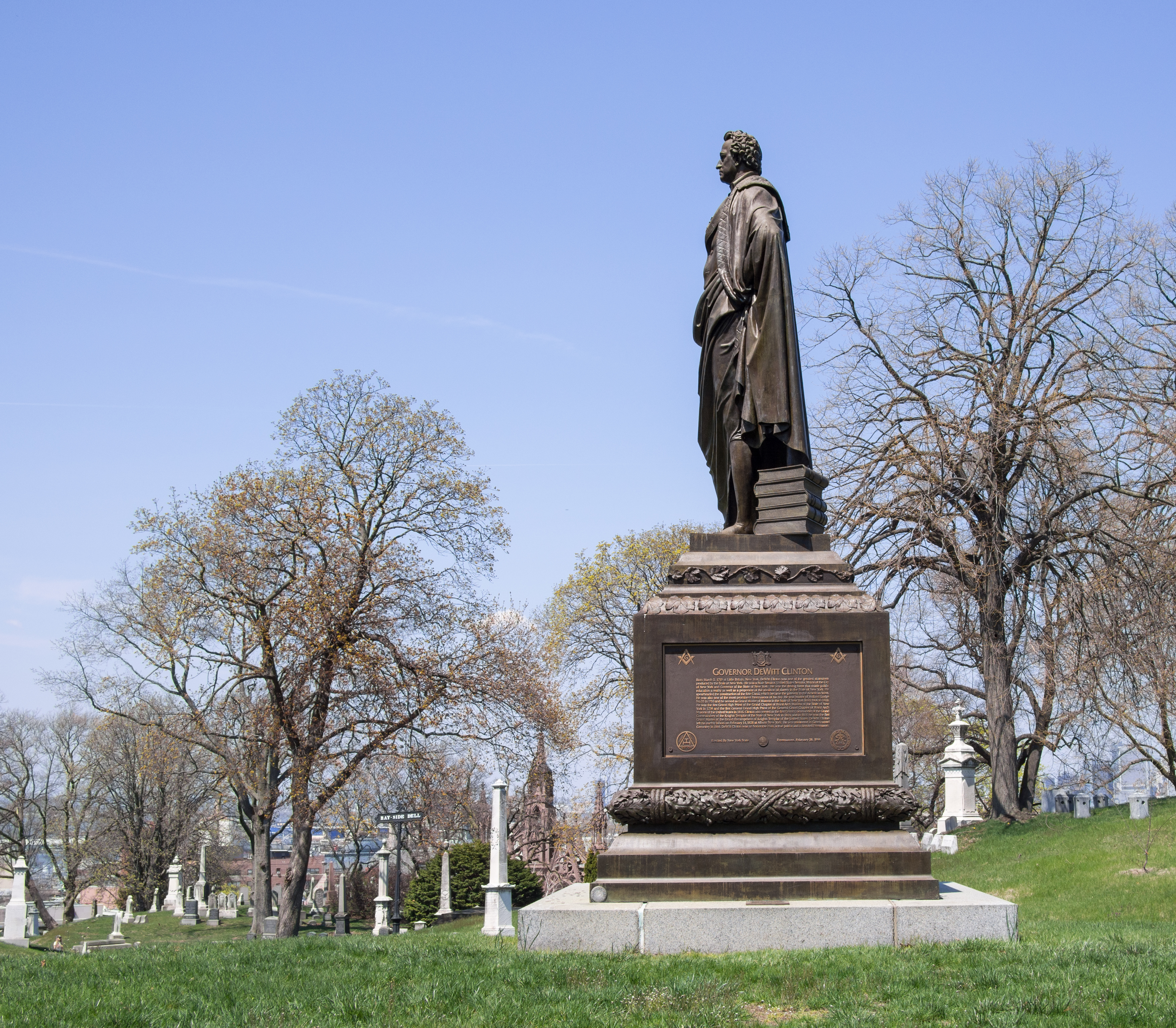
The remains of Governor DeWitt Clinton (statue pictured) were moved to Green-Wood Cemetery in 1844.

Originally, tickets were required to access the cemetery, but the cemetery's porter could reject "improper persons" with tickets; conversely, visitors without tickets could enter at the porter's discretion. Smoking and horseback riding at Green-Wood was prohibited, while only gravesite owners were allowed to travel through the cemetery via carriage. Green-Wood became more popular after former governor DeWitt Clinton was disinterred from a cemetery in Albany, the New York state capital, and moved to Green-Wood in 1844. Cemetery management advertised burial plots to prominent churches, clubs, and other organizations, further increasing Green-Wood's popularity. Large crowds took horse-drawn carriages or ferries to the cemetery, and by 1845 the cemetery recorded 2,300 carriages in a single month. To accommodate visitors, a ferry service was established in 1846. By 1848, the cemetery was recording an estimated 50,000 visitors in nine months.

==== 1850s and 1860s ====
Fauna were being introduced to the cemetery by the 1850s, including a flock of 50 sparrows imported from Europe, who promptly flew away. Another 85 acres (34 ha) to the east was acquired in 1852 through the annexation of land in the then-separate village of Flatbush. By then, half of the land was forested or wooded. A receiving tomb was installed in 1853, and around the same time, the ponds were cleaned and landscaped. A knoll called "Chapel Hill" was also set aside within the cemetery; though Richard Upjohn submitted plans for a cemetery chapel in 1855, Green-Wood initially voted against such a chapel. A gatekeeper's house was installed at the original southern entrance in 1848, the "Thirty Vaults" catacombs in 1854, and a well house in 1855. Finally, in 1858 another 23 acres (9.3 ha) was acquired at the southeastern corner of the cemetery grounds. A plot at the southeast corner of the cemetery was purchased in 1863, allowing the commissioners to straighten out that border. The original fence was also replaced with a metal enclosure beginning in 1860.

An 1854 article in the Gleason's Pictorial Drawing-Room Companion noted that Green-Wood had a variety of wooden buildings, including an old English-style carriage, and that the cemetery was served by carriages leading to ferry piers. By the early 1860s, Green-Wood was drawing annual crowds of over 500,000, second in size in New York state only to Niagara Falls. The cemetery had 7,000 annual burials and 100,000 graves. People had picnics, practiced shooting, strolled about, or merely relaxed on the grounds. There were also horse-drawn carriages leading to the front entrance and throughout the grounds themselves. Cemetery officials began selling stereo cards to visitors, and numerous guides to the cemetery were published, including an illustrated guidebook, a directory, a cemetery history book, and a handbook. Historian Shelly Mehlman Dinhofer said in an exhibit about the cemetery: "Bereavement was a social event", while Town and Country magazine said that the bucolic grounds were "as close as most city-dwellers got to God's Country". Another source likened Green-Wood to a "Victorian Disneyland".

By the 1860s, public streetcar and elevated lines were being established across Brooklyn, making Green-Wood easier to access. In particular, the opening of the Fifth Avenue Elevated station at 25th Street, near the main entrance, benefited the cemetery. In 1861, Richard Upjohn was hired to design a main gate at 25th Street; this was followed by the construction of three other entrances. The paths were paved in the 1860s to allow for easier transport within the cemetery. Bicycles were banned from the paths, a prohibition that continued even after vehicular transport was allowed. Starting in 1862, free interments were offered to the families of New York soldiers who died in war, and a soldiers' burial lot was established. Cast-iron markers were installed along the paths in the mid-1860s, and work started on the Civil War Soldiers' Monument at Green-Wood's highest point in 1868.

==== 1870s to 1890s ====
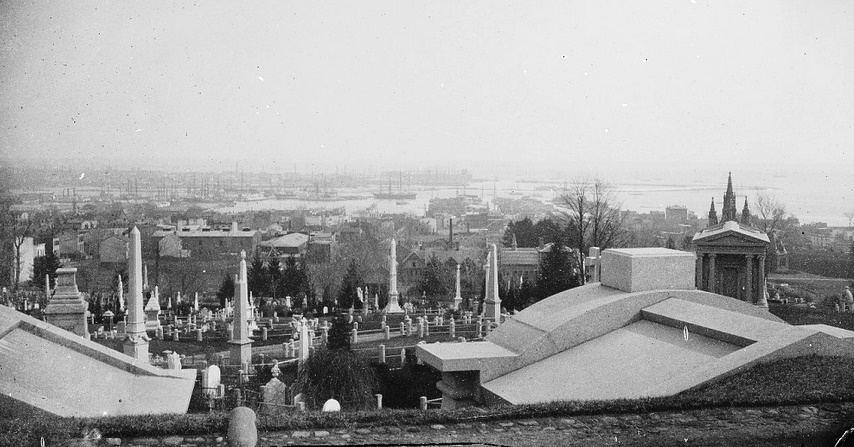
Mount Greenwood in Brooklyn, a late 19th century portrait by George Bradford Brainerd

By the 1870s, the cemetery's rulebook was 80 pages long; this rulebook dictated such details as the layout and style of graves, akin to zoning laws in cities. In 1871, Border Water was partially eliminated to make extra burial space. The cemetery was slightly expanded to 440 acres (180 ha) in 1874. A guide published that year cited Green-Wood as having 172,000 interments, along with 15 miles (24 km) of concrete walks and 17 miles (27 km) of paved roads. Several additional ponds were carved out through the 1870s, including Border Water, Dell Water, Crescent Water, Dale Water, and Meadow Water. The roads were also paved, and new roads, an underground drainage system, and a permanent stone fence were built.

Green-Wood built the Fort Hamilton gate in 1876 to accommodate the anticipated extra crowds. That year, the Civil War Soldiers' Monument was dedicated, and a memorial was erected for the victims of the Brooklyn Theatre fire. Following storms in the 1870s which damaged Green-Wood, cemetery officials built an irrigation system and wells. The cemetery was enlarged again in 1884 to 474 acres (192 ha) via the acquisition of land on the northern border. To prevent the view being marred by the construction of tenements, Green-Wood also purchased lots on the southwest corner. The next year, cemetery officials constructed four water-supply wells. A reservoir was added atop Mt. Washington, the highest point in the cemetery, in 1886; it could store 38,000 U.S. gallons (140,000 L).

By the early 1890s, two ponds had been removed. At the time, the cemetery employed between 100 and 300 people depending on the season. Architecture firm Carrère and Hastings also designed a 30,000-person mausoleum for the cemetery in 1891. During the decade, old engine house, stables, and several enclosures around burial plots were removed, while waiting rooms and restrooms were added at the southern entrance. During this period, thousands of trees were planted, and roads continued to be graded. Brooklyn, and by extension Green-Wood, became part of the City of Greater New York in 1898. By the end of the 19th century, several florists, greenhouses, and monument sellers had opened shops near each of the gates. One such structure was the Weir Greenhouse, located across from the 25th Street entrance and designed by George Curtis Gillespie.

=== 20th century ===
Burials continued through the 20th century, albeit with fewer per year than in the 19th century. Green-Wood, once a preferred burial ground for New York City's Gilded Age elite, was no longer in such high demand by the early 20th century. Gilded Age families increasingly buried their dead in Woodlawn Cemetery in the Bronx, a trend that continued for the rest of the cemetery.

==== 1900s to 1920s ====
By the 1900s, the cemetery was described in Park and Cemetery and Landscape Gardening magazine as the "largest and most important cemetery in Greater New York", averaging about 3,000 new burials per year. Green-Wood was non-sectarian, but was generally favored by white Anglo-Saxon Protestants of good repute; one early regulation prevented those executed for a crime, or even dying in jail, from being buried there. The family of infamous political leader "Boss" Tweed managed to circumvent this rule even though he died in the Ludlow Street Jail. Another rule during that time prevented the erection of mausoleums with exposed perpendicular joints, though a cemetery official in 1907 found that many mausoleums violated this rule, of which 75% required "considerable attention" due to serious structural issues. Parcel owners had to explicitly bequeath their parcels to their heirs, who otherwise had to file affidavits to take over these lots. The receiving tomb at Green-Wood was renovated in 1909 for $60,000. Park and Cemetery and Landscape Gardening reported that the cemetery had 345,000 burials, but Rider's New York City wrote in 1916 that the cemetery had 325,000 burials by then.

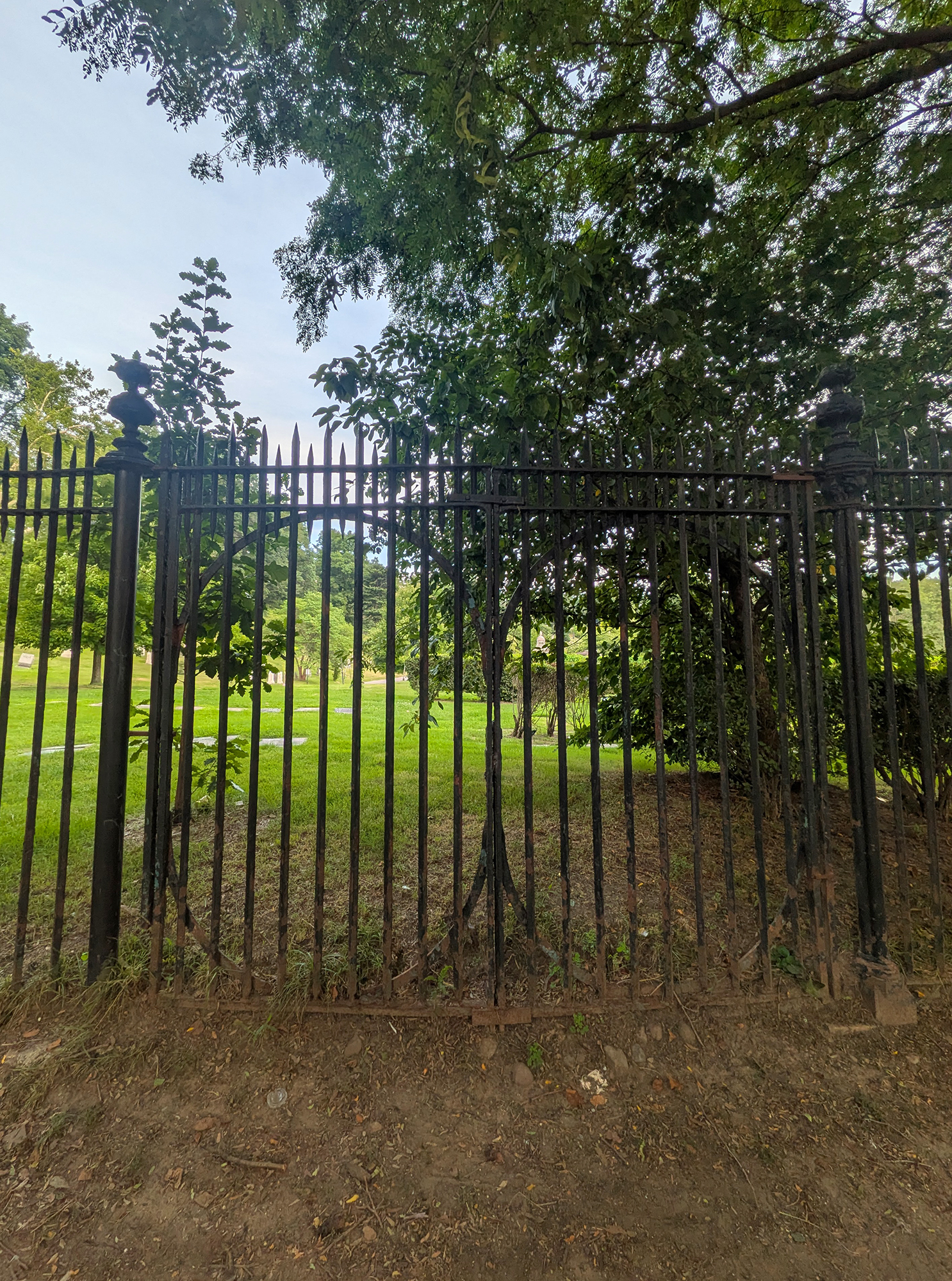
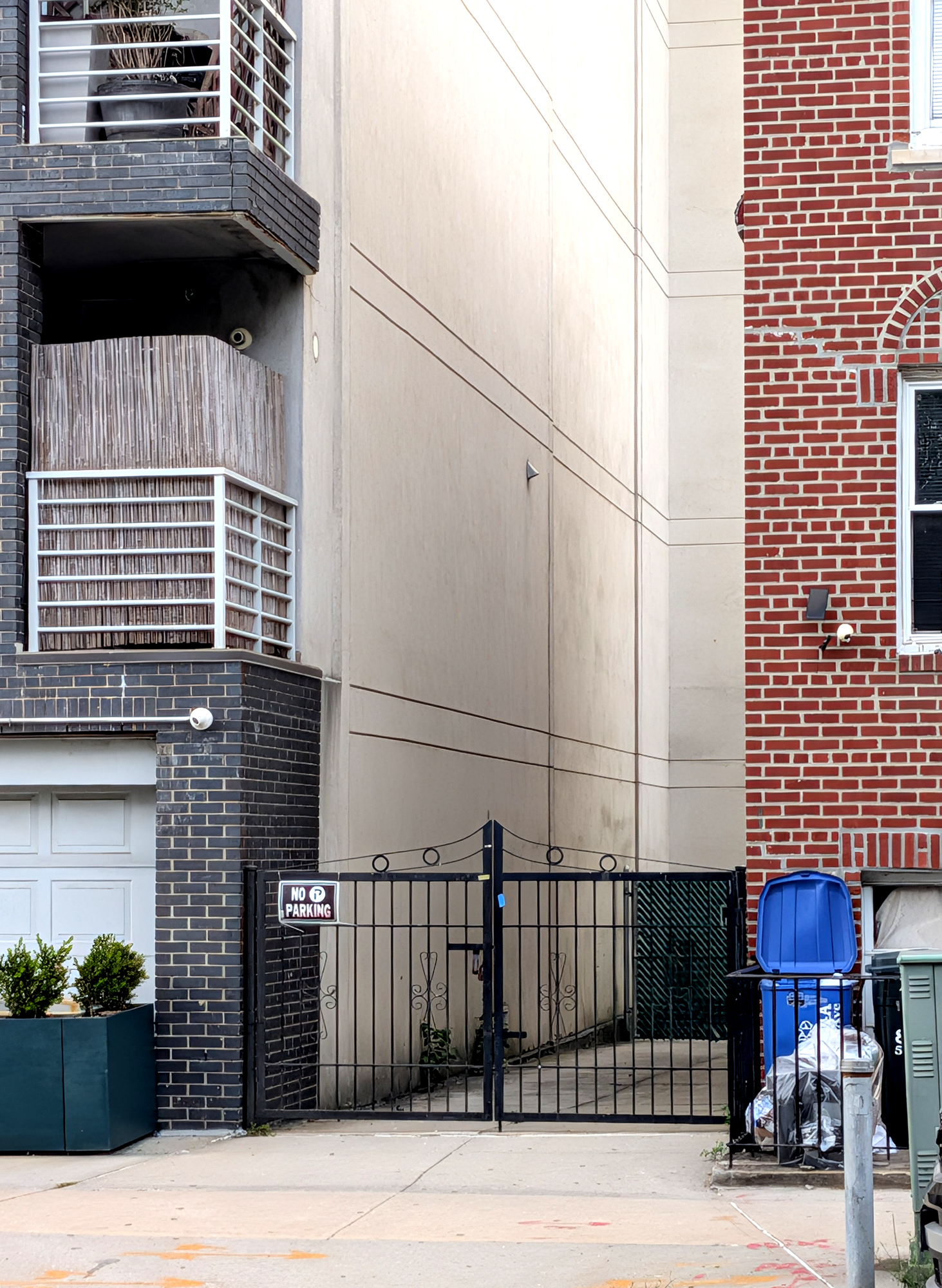
View of old entrance gate and 20th Street right-of-way into the cemetery

A new location for the cemetery's long-delayed chapel was selected at Arbor Water in the first decade of the 20th century. Plans were solicited from three firms in 1909, and Warren and Wetmore won the commission for the chapel. The cemetery announced plans for the new chapel in 1910, and John Thatcher was hired to build it. Work started the next year, but completion of the chapel was delayed due to cemetery officials' demands that no masonry construction take place during the winter. The chapel was completed in 1913. In 1915, the entrance at 20th Street was realigned to connect with Prospect Park West, and another pond was drained. Warren and Wetmore were also hired to redesign several entrances that year, though completion of these entrances was delayed by a decade.

The landscape was in decline by the late 1910s. Gravediggers went on strike in 1919 to protest low wages, but they returned to work within a week, without having received any concessions. A war monument, dedicated to veterans from Long Island, was dedicated at the cemetery in 1920; there were also proposals at the time to add a memorial obelisk to the cemetery, similar to Boston's Bunker Hill Monument. By that decade, Green-Wood had a maintenance fund of at least $2 million. Dead trees were removed in the 1920s, and a five-year road repaving project began in 1924. By then, automobiles were commonplace within the cemetery, and they often violated the 6 miles per hour (9.7 km/h) speed limit. The Prospect Park West entrance opened in 1926, and the 25th Street and Fort Hamilton entrances were rebuilt the next year.

==== 1930s to 1960s ====
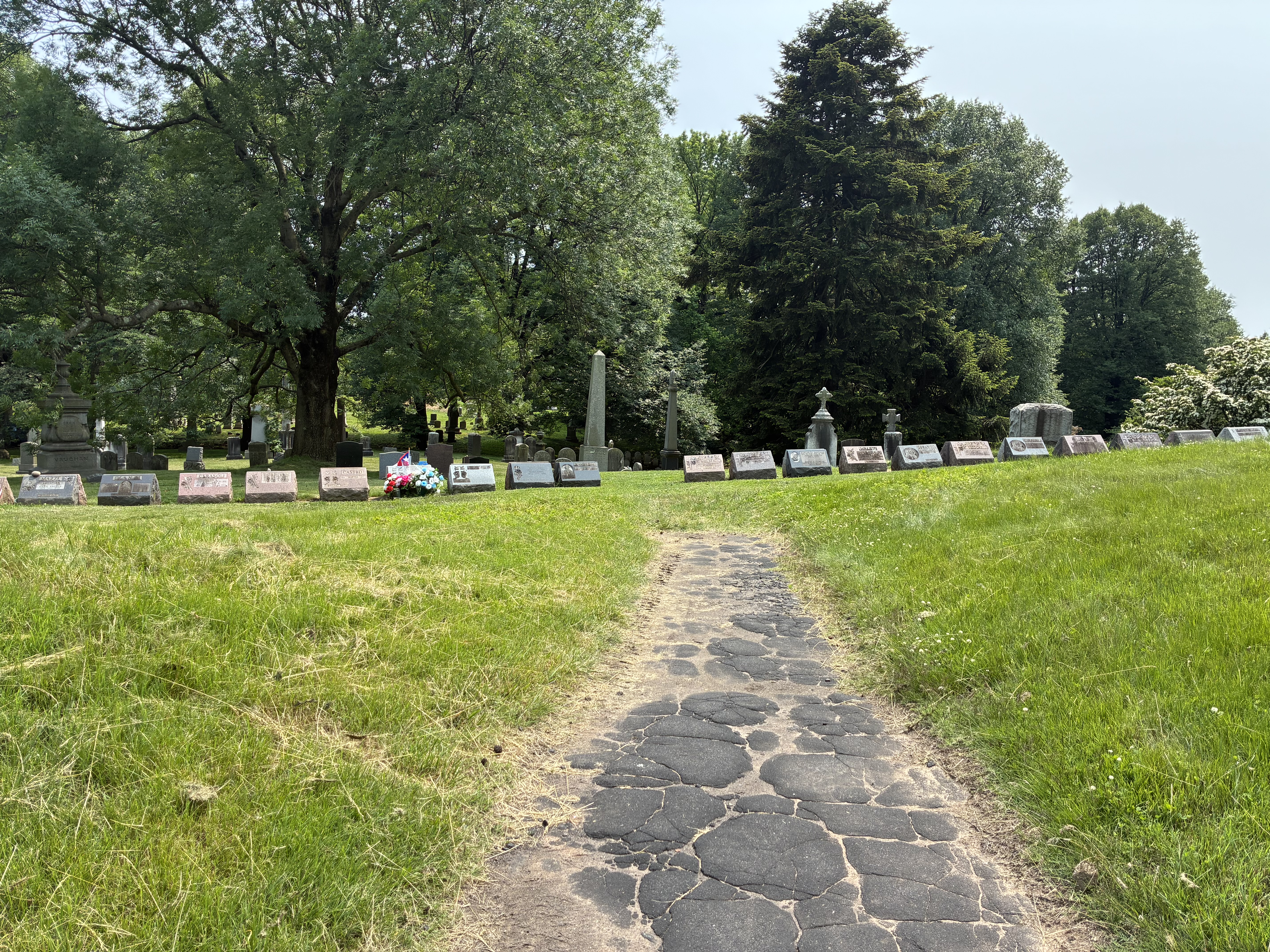
A line of graves in the cemetery

In the mid-20th century, Green-Wood Cemetery remained a nonprofit organization. Road reconstructions continued through the mid-1930s, when the Works Progress Administration repaved the roads at the cemetery's edges. Demolition of gravesite enclosures continued during that period. Families were generally not allowed to remove the deceased from the grounds; this prompted a widow to sue in 1933 for the right to disinter her husband, which a state court permitted her to do. Workers went on strike in 1937 and again in 1939, requiring the deceased to be buried by mourners. By the cemetery's 100th anniversary in 1938, there were 440,000 people interred there. The clock tower at the 34th Street entrance was demolished in 1941, as part of the demolition of the adjacent Fifth Avenue elevated line. Iron fences were removed during World War II for the war effort. Green-Wood gravediggers again went on strike in May 1948; the strike ended seven weeks later once they received pay increases.

One entrance was demolished in 1951; by then, only one of the five original gatehouses (the Fort Hamilton entrance) still had a gatekeeper living there. Annual burials had declined to about 2,000 by that decade. A crematorium with a columbarium was built at Green-Wood starting in 1954, the first crematorium in New York City in a half-century. This crematory opened in September 1955. By the end of the 1950s, another reservoir had been filled for new lots. More than 1,000 enclosures were removed from 1950 to 1961, the same year that work on a new crematorium began. The cemetery was also affected by additional strikes among the gravediggers in 1966, as well as thefts of brass and other metal from graves.

==== 1970s to 1990s ====
By the 1970s, Green-Wood had about 500,000 burials, and vandalism was common. In part to reduce vandalism, the cemetery was largely closed to visitors. Access was restricted except for family members of the deceased, commemorations such as Memorial Day, and limited tours. Regular tours were provided by a retired police officer who had studied Green-Wood's history for decades and by a local couple who lectured on the cemetery. Visitors needed permits just to enter the cemetery in a car, and the New York Daily News called Green-Wood "one of the most tightly guarded cemeteries". During that decade, Green-Wood still lacked electricity and retained some horse-hitching posts from the 19th century.

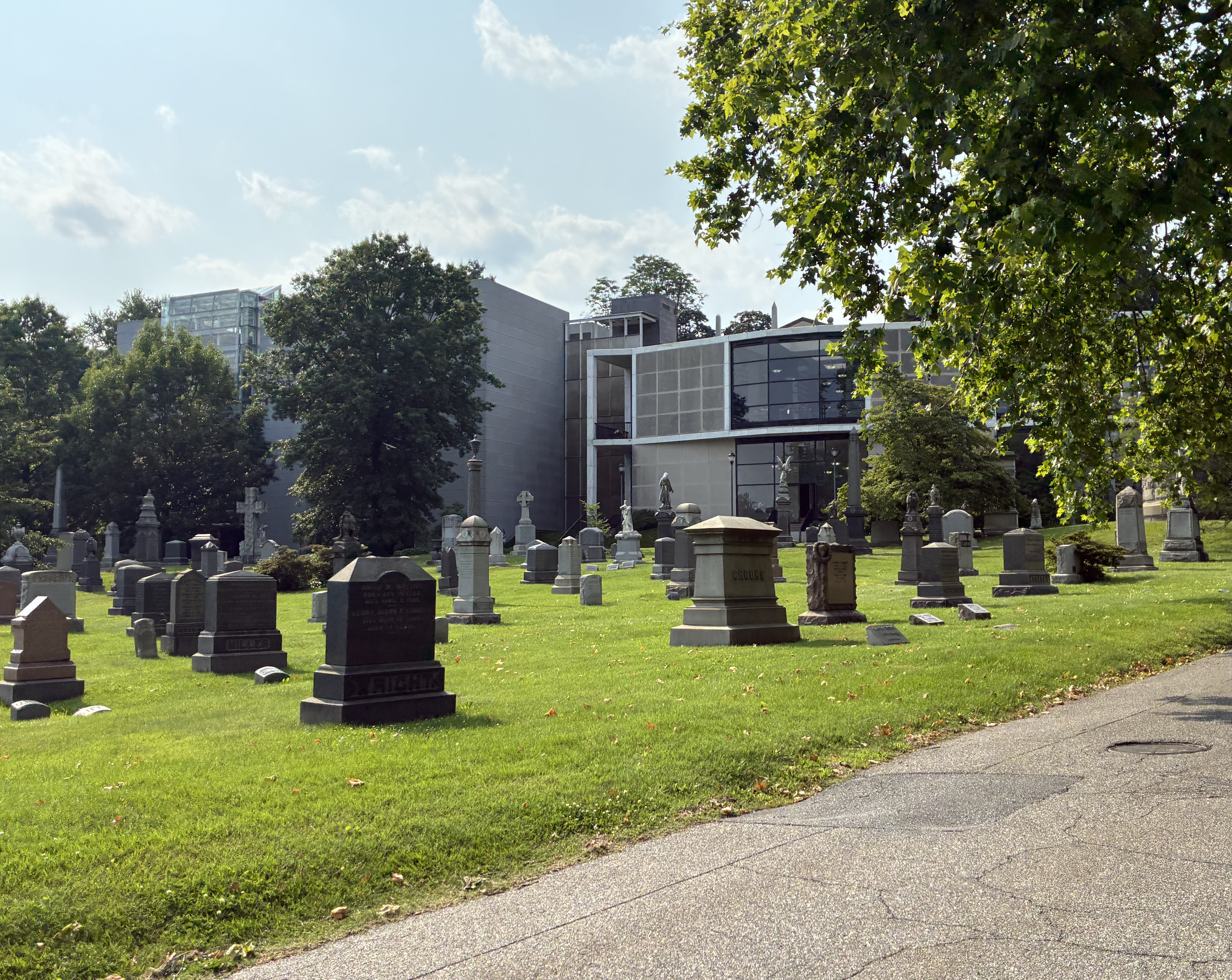
The Hillside Mausoleum, expanded in the 1980s

The columbarium was expanded from 1975 to 1977. Further strikes among gravediggers took place in 1973 and in 1982, the latter of which lasted several weeks. Two community mausoleums were finished in the late 1980s, and another community mausoleum, the Hillside Mausoleum, was expanded. A retaining wall was built around Sylvan Water in the late 1980s, and the Hillside Mausoleum was further expanded in the early 1990s. The north gate was restored in the mid-1990s, and new offices were built around that time, allowing the crematory building to be renovated. This was followed by the restoration of the chapel in the late 1990s.

By the 1990s, Green-Wood was running out of available space; it had removed numerous pathways and roads to make room for additional burials. Though the cemetery had about $200 million in assets by the end of the decade, the grounds cost $4 million a year to maintain, and many monuments (particularly those made of marble) were deteriorating. The cemetery employed over 100 staff during that decade. Concurrently, cemetery officials began to market Green-Wood as a tourist attraction and relaxed restrictions on access. Although modern crowds were not as intrigued by the concept of death as 19th-century crowds had been, visitors still came for the landscape and for the notable people buried there. In 1999, the cemetery hosted its first-ever concert, and the Green-Wood Historic Fund was also created to help with preservation and programming. Rich Moylan, Green-Wood's president, said the events were intended to prevent Green-Wood from becoming an abandoned cemetery, which under New York state law could be taken over by a local government.

=== 21st century ===
==== 2000s and 2010s ====
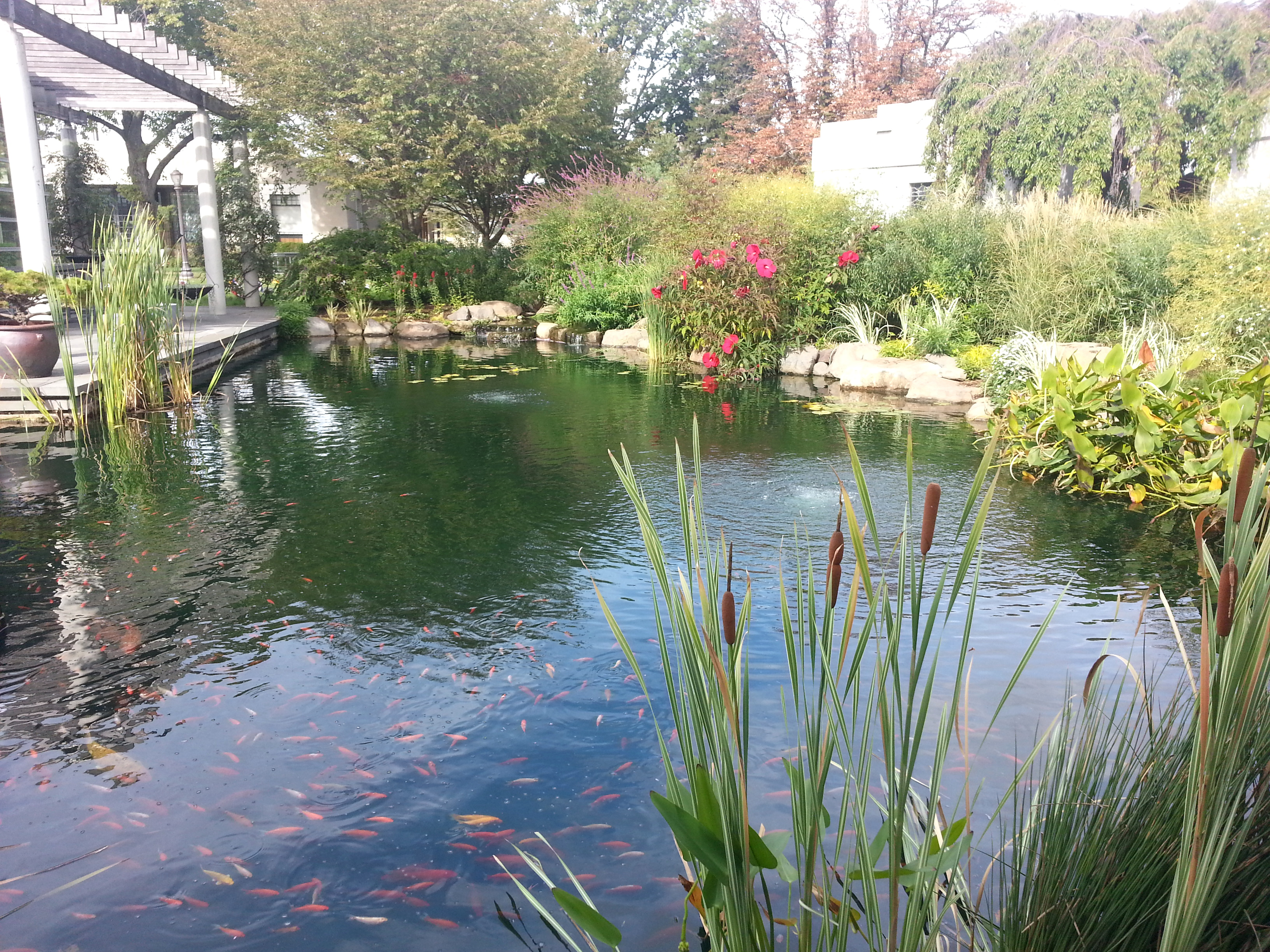
Koi pond in the cemetery

The chapel reopened in 2000, having been closed for several decades. Construction of the last phase of the Hillside Mausoleum began in 2001, and Platt Byard Dovell Architects was hired to design the mausoleum addition. The mausoleum annex, which cost $16 million, was completed in 2004. Also during the early 2000s, the Civil War monument was also restored. In addition, the cemetery began allowing people to sponsor older monuments. Green-Wood officials also sought to have the city government establish a protected view between the cemetery's Minerva statue and the Statue of Liberty. The city was initially uninterested in creating the protected view, but it agreed in 2010 to create an advisory bulletin denoting residents' position on high-rise development in the area.

The cemetery had 270,000 visitors by 2007, nearly double its annual visitation five years prior. By then, there was little space for new interments at Green-Wood Cemetery, which news media estimated would run out of space within one or two decades. Cemetery surveyor Kestutis Demereckas removed additional roads and paths, providing additional space for several more years' worth of burials. Even so, Demereckas told The New York Times in 2009 that he sometimes searched the cemetery for days without finding any vacant land. Although the cemetery still had 1,300 annual interments, most of the new burials took place on land that had already been sold. Because of the infeasibility of relying on new land sales, Green-Wood began raising money through other means such as trolley tours. Green-Wood hosted film screenings to attract visitors, though some decedents' families objected to the films.

Annual visitation had further increased to 300,000 or 400,000 by the early 2010s in part due to the cemetery's increased emphasis on events and programs. Cemetery officials acquired the Weir Greenhouse in 2011 with plans to convert it into a visitor center. Hurricane Sandy in October 2012 toppled or damaged hundreds of trees and gravestones, causing an estimated $500,000 in damage. Green-Wood moved its offices just outside the cemetery in 2014, allowing the existing office building inside cemetery grounds to be demolished to make room for more burials. By the mid-2010s, the wealthy were again choosing to buy burial plots at Green-Wood. The cemetery began performing green burials later that decade. Officials repurchased the 0.4-acre (0.16 ha) Cedar Dell plot from the Reformed Dutch Church of Brooklyn in 2017, repurposing it for green burials.

==== 2020s to present ====
During the COVID-19 pandemic in New York City, in 2020, the cemetery extended its hours of operation to accommodate visitors looking for open space; some visitors used the grounds for recreation, against cemetery rules. Green-Wood also handled increasing numbers of burials—up to 150 per week—at the pandemic's peak. Following Hurricane Henri and Hurricane Ida in 2021, cemetery officials completed several flood-resiliency projects, including the addition of stormwater storage tanks and water-absorbent pavement. A storm drain was also installed from Sylvan Water to the municipal sewage system. Moylan announced his retirement in 2024 and was succeeded the next year by former New York City deputy mayor Meera Joshi. By mid-decade, there was so little space for new burials, officials were looking for any available space they could find between existing graves.

A visitor center opened at the Weir Greenhouse in April 2026, at which point half a million people visited the cemetery annually. The same year, the New York City Council allocated $4 million for a new bike path and gate just outside the cemetery's perimeter. Cemetery officials also announced plans to allow human composting by 2027, making Green-Wood the first cemetery on the US East Coast to allow the practice; by then, both its traditional burials and its cremations were becoming environmentally unsustainable.

== Notable burials ==
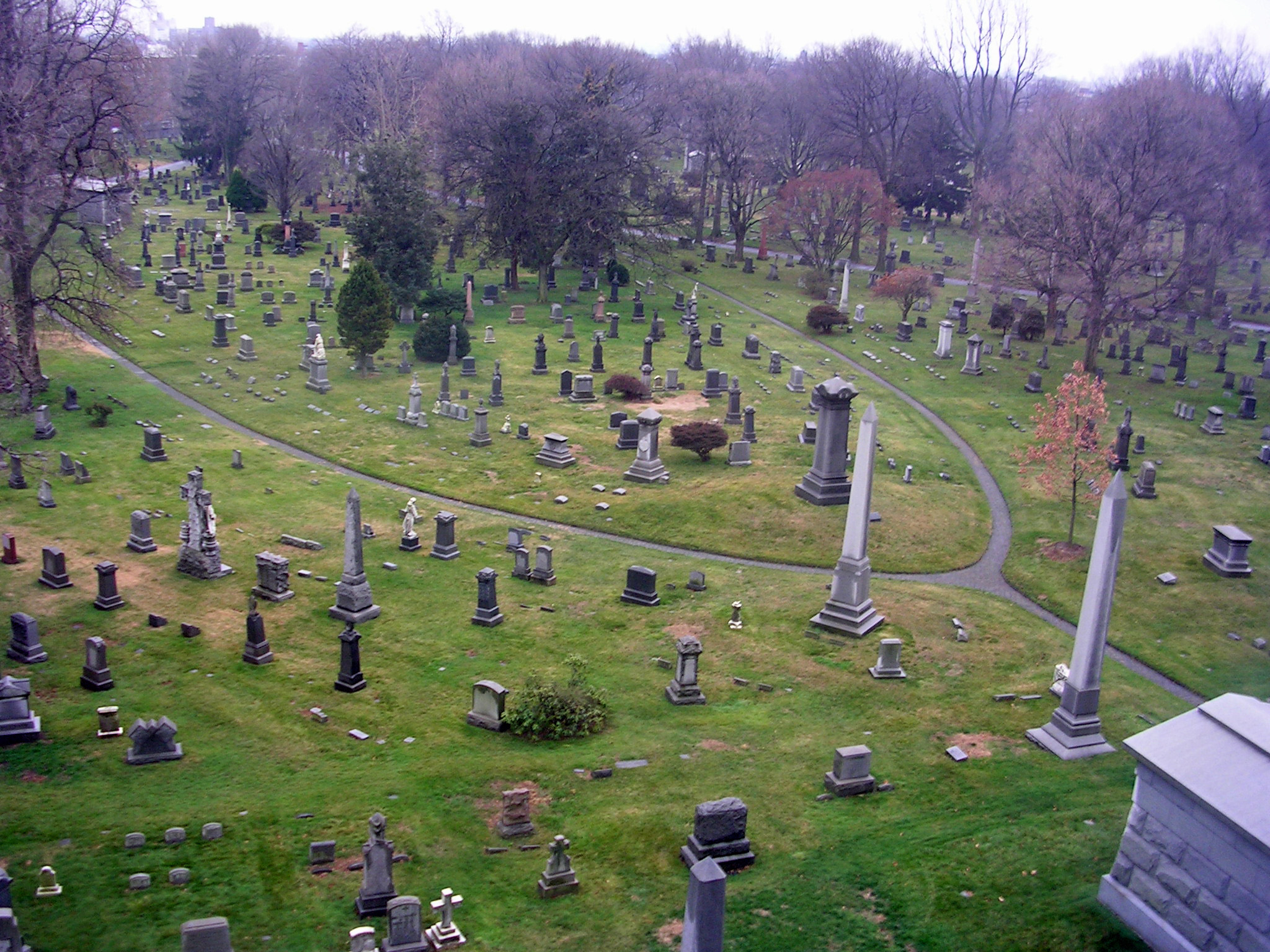
Vista from the Hillside Mausoleum

Green-Wood Cemetery's interments include many notable people, leading The Philadelphia Inquirer to call the cemetery "a sort of deathstyles of the rich and famous of 19th-century New York". Politicians buried there include nine unsuccessful United States presidential candidates including Horace Greeley and George Francis Train, as well as US senators Dixon H. Lewis and John Henderson. The cemetery contains the graves of other public leaders as well, such as William M. Tweed, Henry Ward Beecher, William Oland Bourne, and DeWitt Clinton. Assassinated New York City councilman James E. Davis was briefly interred at Green-Wood, but his body was removed in 2003 after his assassin was also buried there.

Ten veterans from the American Revolutionary War are interred at Green-Wood. The cemetery also has the corpses of over 5,000 American Civil War soldiers. These include 40 Civil War generals, two of whom have served in the Confederate States Army. During the Civil War, Green-Wood Cemetery created the "Soldiers' Lot" for free veterans' burials; this lot included less than 1 acre (0.40 ha) of land. As many as 300 World War I veterans are also buried there. (Note: Sources disagree on whether the cemetery has the remains of nearly 160, 200, or 300 World War I veterans.) Eight British Commonwealth service personnel are buried at Green-Wood—four from World War I and four from World War II—and their graves are registered by the Commonwealth War Graves Commission. The cemetery maintains databases of deceased American Civil War and World War II veterans who are buried there. Samuel Chester Reid, a United States Navy officer who designed the 20-star American flag of 1818, is also buried there.

Green-Wood is the interment place for notable theatrical figures such as Leonard Bernstein, Fred Ebb, DeWolf Hopper, Henry Miller, Lola Montez, Frank Morgan, and William Wheatley. Other artistic figures buried there include actors Mae West, William S. Hart, and Ralph Morgan; rapper Pop Smoke; designer Louis Comfort Tiffany; painters Asher B. Durand, Jean-Michel Basquiat, and George Catlin; printmakers Nathaniel Currier and James Ives; and architect James Renwick Jr. In addition, businessmen Edward R. Squibb, William Colgate, Frederick August Otto Schwarz, Charles Pfizer, Thomas C. Durant, and John William Mackay are interred at Green-Wood.

Green-Wood contains the remains of some 200 baseball-related figures, including baseball pioneers Henry Chadwick, Duncan Curry, William H. Tucker, and William Wheaton; executive Charles Ebbets; and player Jim Creighton. Several gangsters such as Albert Anastasia, Joe Gallo, and Johnny Torrio are also buried at Green-Wood. There are other notable burials such as economist Henry George; diplomat Townsend Harris; conductor Leonard Bernstein; and physicians J. Marion Sims and Susan McKinney Steward. The oldest person buried at Green-Wood is Sarah W. Kairns, who lived to age 117.

Although pets are no longer allowed to be interred, several animals were buried there before a ban on pet burials was instituted in 1879. These include Gipsy, who belonged to Lemuel Wilmarth, and the statue of Rex, where visitors commonly leave sticks.

== Operations ==
Green-Wood Cemetery is a nonprofit 501(c)(13) cemetery under US tax law. Meera Joshi has been president of the cemetery since 2025. The cemetery president formerly had a dedicated residence in Park Slope, which was sold off in 2026.

Decedents at the cemetery are typically either buried or cremated, though on-site human composting is planned to begin in 2027. The cemetery allows both traditional burials, where bodies are embalmed, and green burials, where bodies are not embalmed (allowing them to biodegrade) and are placed in biodegradable caskets. Decedents who undergo green burials are typically placed in shallower graves. In addition to the main receiving vault, several mausoleums throughout the cemetery have additional space for urns. The cemetery retains printed records of interments; the records from between 1840 and 1937 have been digitized since 2023.

=== Public visitation ===
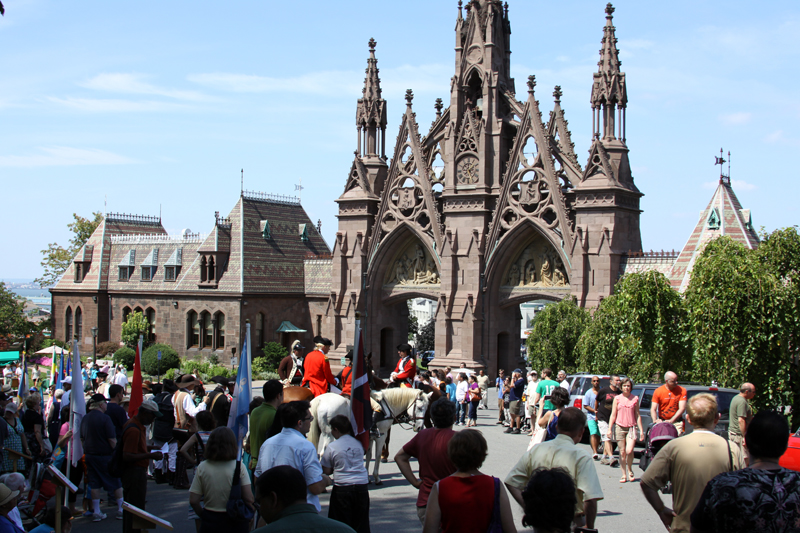
Battle of Long Island commemoration inside the main 25th Street entrance to Green-Wood Cemetery

The cemetery is open for public visitation and allows free self-guided tours. For a fee, the cemetery also hosts trolley tours of the site, including a tour of pet graves. Other guided tours are given, including tours of the catacombs. The cemetery is part of the Audubon Cooperative Sanctuary program and promotes birdwatching on its grounds. Pets, conversely, are banned from the cemetery. Active recreation, along with other activities such as tree-climbing, are also prohibited.

As of 2025, Green-Wood hosts about 300 annual events for the public, such as movie screenings, dances, music recitals, and educational programs. There are also culture-specific celebrations honoring ancestors, such as Qingming Festivals, Days of the Dead, and hanami. The cemetery began hosting "Sunday in the Cemetery" events in 2025, with events about death, grief, and healing. There are grief-education workshops at Green-Wood, as well as programs such as a "grieving and weaving" course. As part of Battle Week, the cemetery also hosts reenactments of the Battle of Long Island.

Green-Wood Cemetery selects an artist-in-residence every year. Site-specific art is also hosted at the cemetery. Over the years, these have included Sophie Calle's Here Lie the Secrets of the Visitors of Green-Wood Cemetery (commenced 2017), Jean Shin's Celadon Landscape (2015–2019) and Offering (2026), and Janine Antoni's I am fertile ground (2019).

=== Green-Wood Historic Fund ===
In 1999, the Green-Wood Historic Fund was created to continue preservation, beautification, educational programs, and community outreach. The Green-Wood Historic Fund is a 501(c)(3) nonprofit institution. In 2008, Green-Wood started to acquire a collection of art pertaining to those buried in the cemetery; this collection included 400 artworks by 2024. The cemetery also has a library with over 1,000 items.

==== Veteran identification initiatives ====
Under cemetery historian Jeffrey Richman, the Green-Wood Historic Fund launched the Civil War Project, an effort to identify and remember Civil War veterans buried at Green-Wood, in 2002. These early graves had either sunk into the soil, been damaged, or had their markers erased; though some veterans had been identified and were regularly memorialized by local groups, there had previously been no overarching effort to identify all the veterans. About 1,200 gravestones were added for Civil War soldiers in the following decade, including 1,000 gravestones dedicated in 2007 alone. By 2021, Richman estimated that 2,400 gravestones had been installed.

In 2017, the Green-Wood Historic Fund identified another 200 World War I veterans who were interred in Green-Wood. The fund began another veteran-identification effort in 2021; this involved identifying World War II veterans and creating an online database of them. At the time, the fund estimated that thousands of Brooklyn's 326,000 World War II veterans were interred at Green-Wood. During the World War II project's first year, the fund identified 370 veterans who had been interred there.

== Impact and legacy ==
=== Reception ===
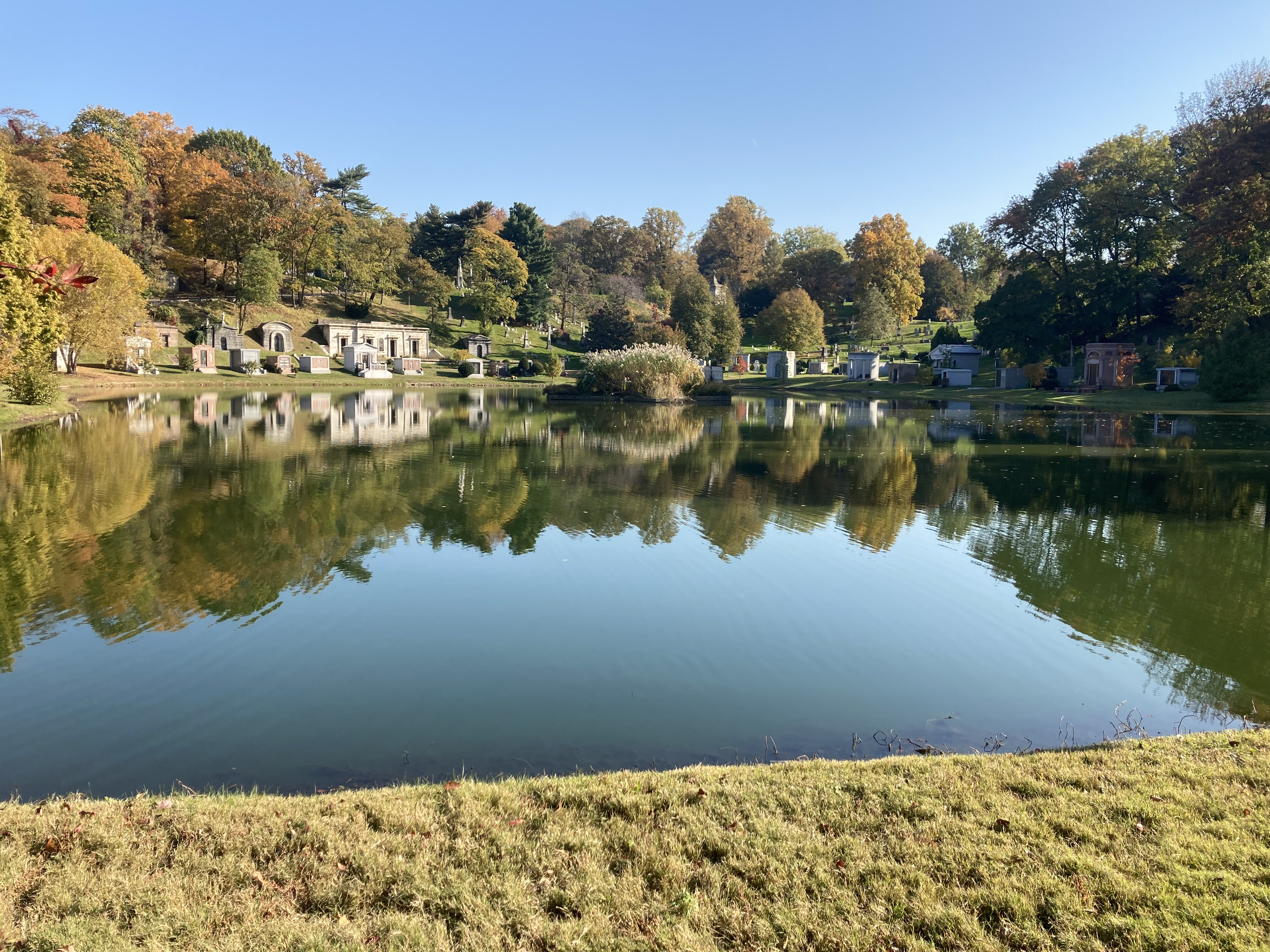
Sylvan Water mausoleums

An early observer regarded Green-Wood Cemetery as "magnificent" because it was so close to New York Harbor and that "the ocean rolling and moaning, with its fine melancholy, organ-like sounds, so near, like a mighty mourner". Another 19th-century observer, Theodore L. Cuyler, called Green-Wood "a vast and exquisitely beautiful dormitory". The New York Times wrote in 1866, "it is the ambition of the New Yorker to live upon the Fifth Avenue, to take his airings in the [Central] Park, and to sleep with his fathers in Green-wood". Buck Murphy of Design magazine retrospectively wrote that the cemetery succeeded despite its relative distance from Brooklyn's developed areas.

In 1970, the Times, quoting Green-Wood commissioners' self-description of the grounds as "a haven of posthumous America", said that "in any other country perhaps it would be a major tourist attraction". Another writer for the same newspaper said Green-Wood contributed to Brooklyn's being "the finest surviving example of a Victorian city to be found anywhere in America". Times architectural critic Paul Goldberger said that the cemetery was "an almost magical kingdom" of different styles that was best seen in its totality, and called it "one of New York City's most impressive public open spaces". Rebecca Morris of the New York Daily News said that "what fascinates today is the permanence", saying that wealthy decedents' mausoleums still stood while their mansions had long vanished. In the 1990s, The Washington Post wrote that the cemetery was a bucolic, somewhat forgotten place, and Times writer Peter Hellman wrote: "New York, in all its grandeur and ambition, rascality and tragedy, is encapsulated like nowhere else" at Green-Wood. The New Republic wrote: "It was once said that a New Yorker's ideal life consisted of a mansion on Fifth Avenue, an office on Wall Street and a plot in Greenwood."

In the 21st century, a critic for The Guardian wrote: "If the meandering paths and genteel lawns of Central Park represent New York's romantic side, then the hulking mausoleums and Gothic stonework of Green-Wood capture Gotham in all its brooding glory." American Heritage magazine described Green-Wood as "mostly a fascinating collection of competing mausoleums, crypts, obelisks", mixed with woodlands, a battlefield, and a bird sanctuary. A CNN travel guide in 2013 rated Green-Wood among the world's most scenic cemeteries, and the AIA Guide to New York City described Green-Wood as "Brooklyn's first public park by default long before Prospect Park was created."

The 25th Street gate also received architectural commentary. Morris regarded the gate as befitting its landmark status, citing its spires rising "toward heaven" and the historical nature of the cemetery itself. Goldberger wrote in 1984 that the 25th Street entrance was "surely the triumph of the 19th-century Gothic revival in New York City". He later said it was "a monumental arch, a garden gate, and a means of passage to a very separate world, all at once", and that the gate's mere presence distinguished it from Prospect Park, which lacked such a grand entrance. The Baltimore Sun wrote that the gate was "perhaps [Green-Wood's] chief glory", while The Washington Post called the gate "an impressive piece of architecture in an otherwise uninspiring part of the borough" .

=== Design influence and media ===
After leaving Green-Wood, Douglass modeled his two subsequent garden cemeteries upon its design: Albany Rural Cemetery (1845–1846) in Menands, New York, and Mount Hermon Cemetery (1848), in Quebec City. Green-Wood helped inspire the development of both Central Park in Manhattan and Prospect Park in Brooklyn. Along with Cambridge's Mount Auburn Cemetery and Philadelphia's Laurel Hill Cemetery, it also spurred the construction of other rural cemeteries across the US, which by the late 19th century were increasingly popular.

The cemetery has been the subject of several exhibits. These include Now Reposing at Green-Wood Cemetery (1986) at Brooklyn College and Rediscovering Green-Wood Cemetery (1992) at the Brooklyn Historical Society. Yet another exhibit, hosted at the Museum of the City of New York in 2013, included over 200 artifacts related to people interred at Green-Wood. The cemetery's notable dead are the focus of the book Brooklyn's Green-Wood Cemetery: New York's Buried Treasure, published in 1998 and written by cemetery historian Jeffrey Richman. Some of the decedents mentioned in Richman's book are also depicted in a series of plays produced by Eric Richmond in 2002.

=== Landmark designations ===
The New York City Landmarks Preservation Commission (LPC) designated the 25th Street gate as a New York City landmark in 1966, and the Weir Greenhouse was designated a city landmark in 1982. For several decades, the LPC deferred action on whether to designate the entire cemetery as a landmark, giving the site preliminary protection, which was rescinded in 2014. In February 2016, the LPC endorsed individual buildings for designation, while rejecting a cemetery-wide designation, which would have required families of decedents to seek city approval for any gravesite modifications. The Fort Hamilton Parkway gate and the cemetery's chapel were designated as city landmarks in April 2016.

The Weir Greenhouse is separately listed on the National Register of Historic Places (NRHP). The cemetery itself was listed on the NRHP in 1997 as a historic district. In 2006, the U.S. Department of the Interior designated Green-Wood as a National Historic Landmark (NHL) district. The NHL designation, the first granted to a still-operational cemetery in New York state, was ratified because of the cemetery's Gothic Revival architecture and its rural character.

== Gallery ==
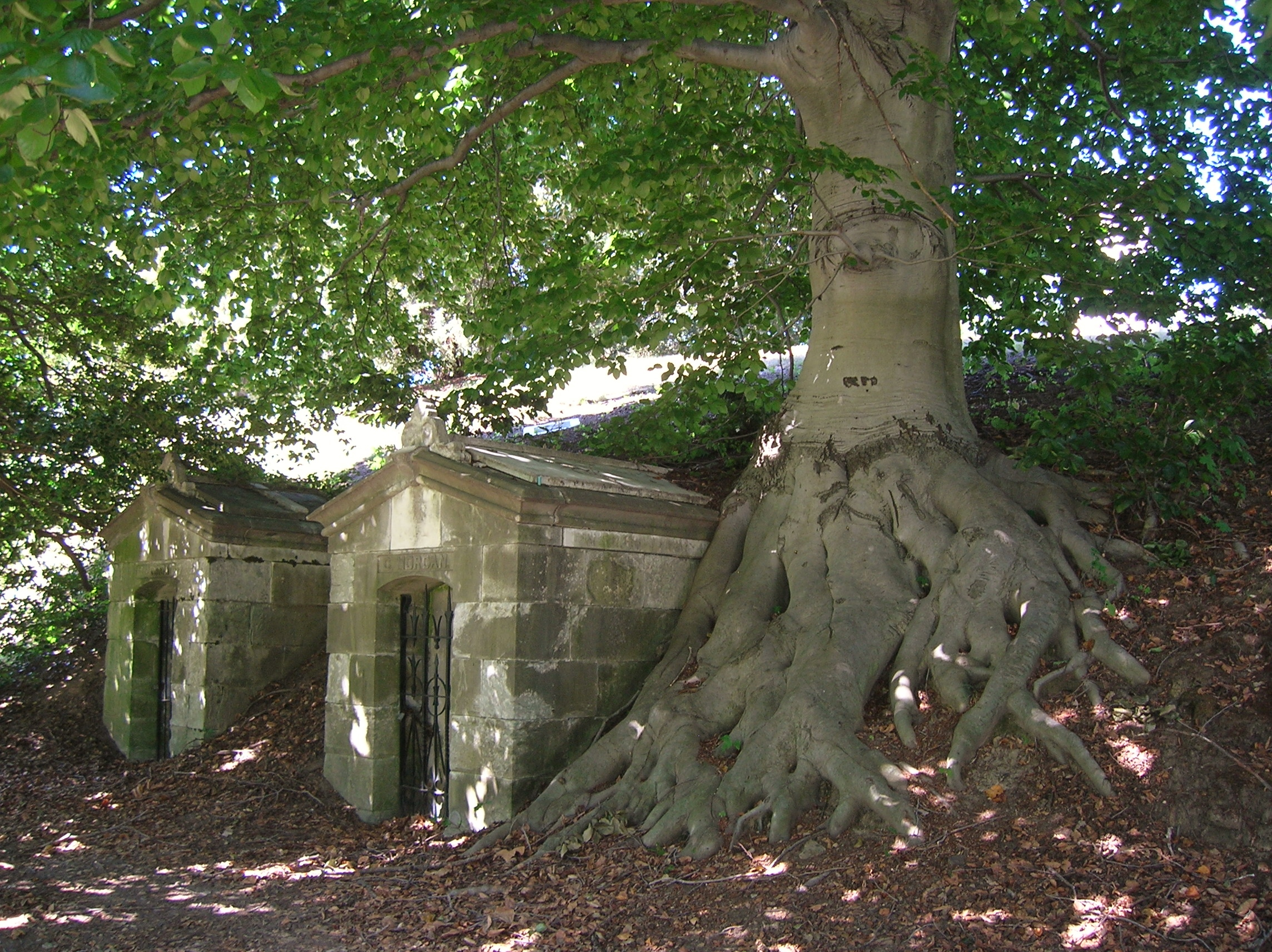
European beech tree and mausoleums

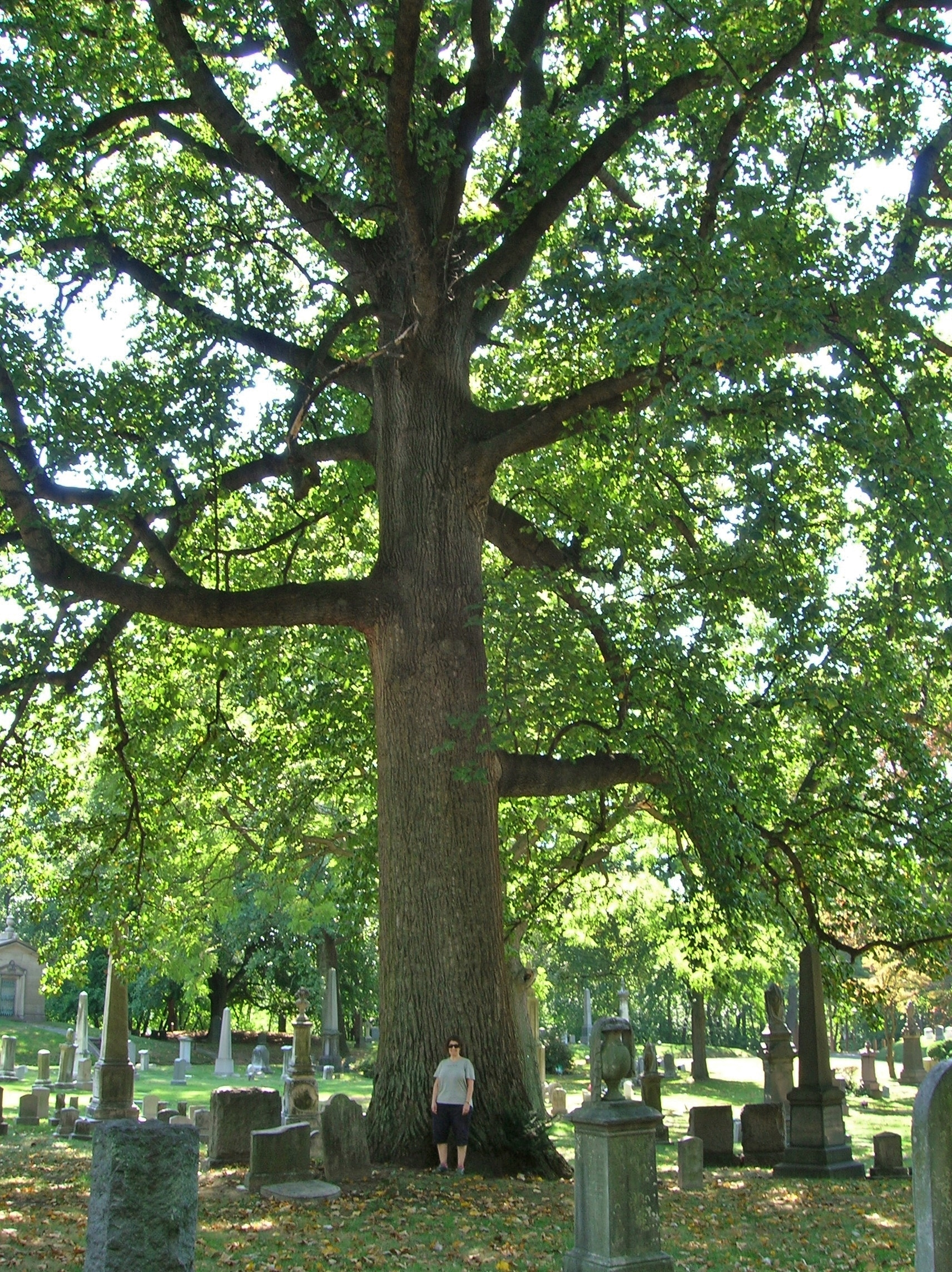
Largest tulip tree in the cemetery

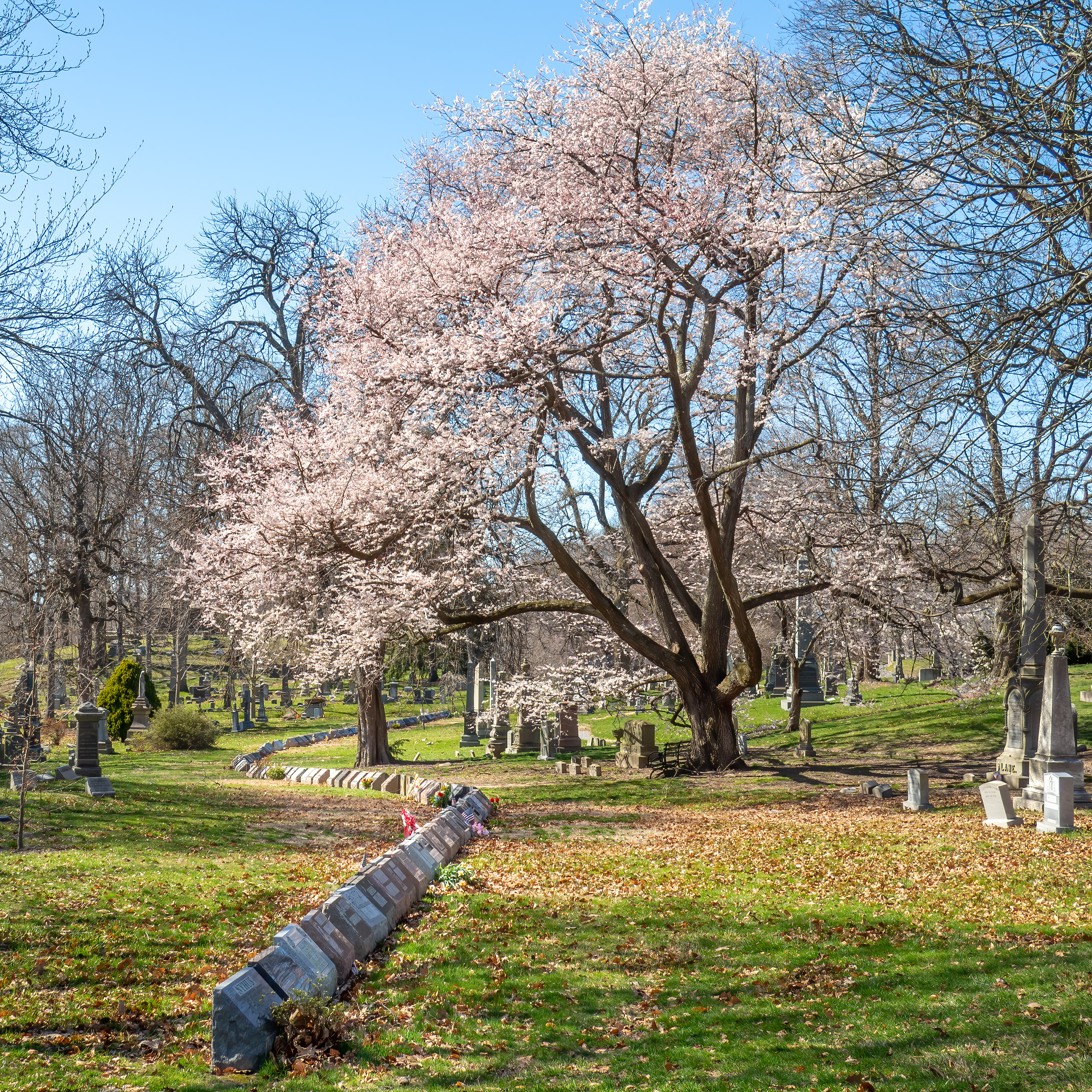
Yoshino cherry tree by a line of graves

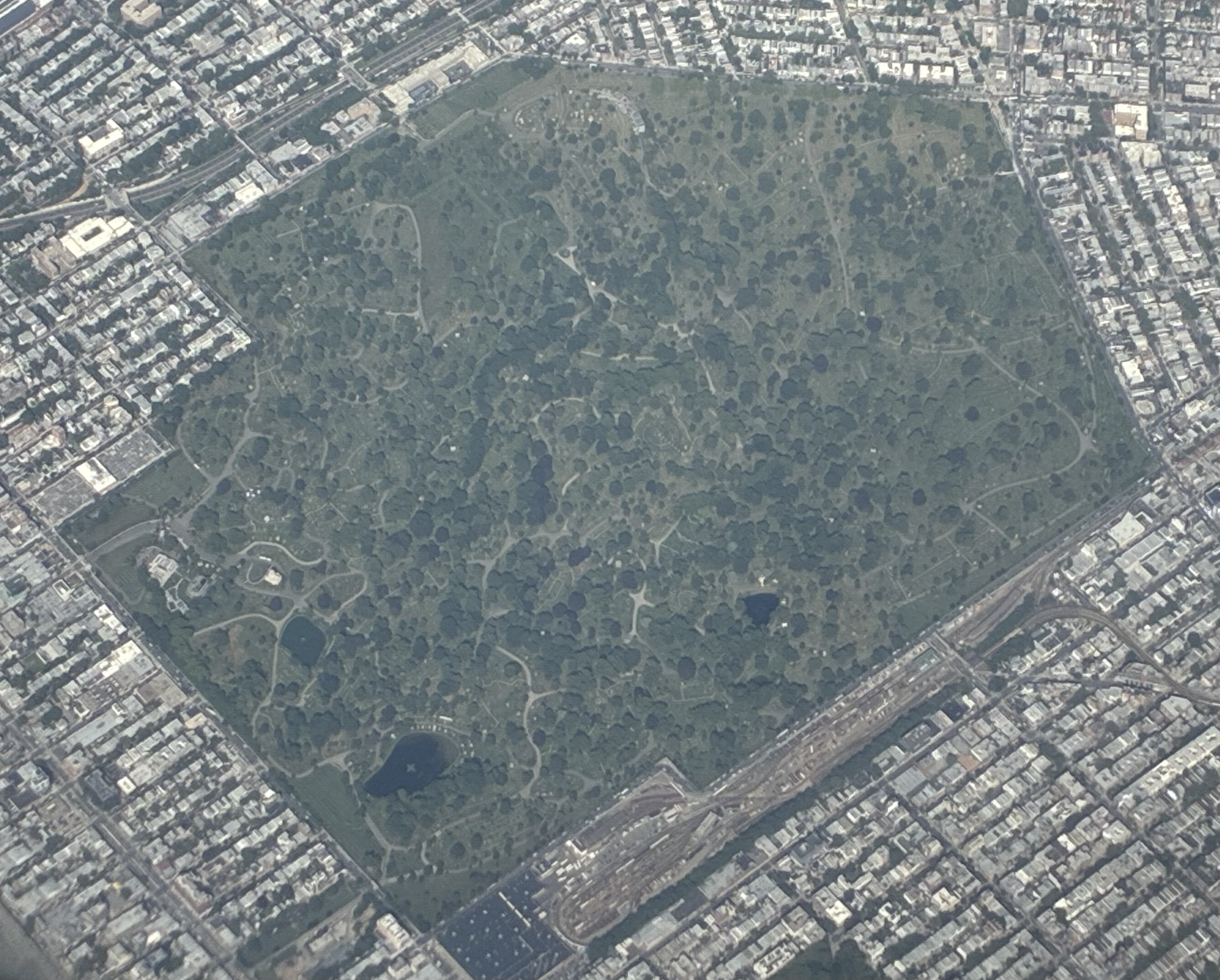
Aerial view of the cemetery

== See also ==
- List of burial places of justices of the Supreme Court of the United States
- List of cemeteries in New York
- List of cemeteries in the United States
- List of mausoleums
- List of National Historic Landmarks in New York City
- List of New York City Designated Landmarks in Brooklyn
- National Register of Historic Places listings in Brooklyn
- Rural Cemetery Act – New York cemetery statute
