= Weir Greenhouse =

Building in Brooklyn, New York

- U.S. National Register of Historic Places
- New York State Register of Historic Places
- New York City Landmark
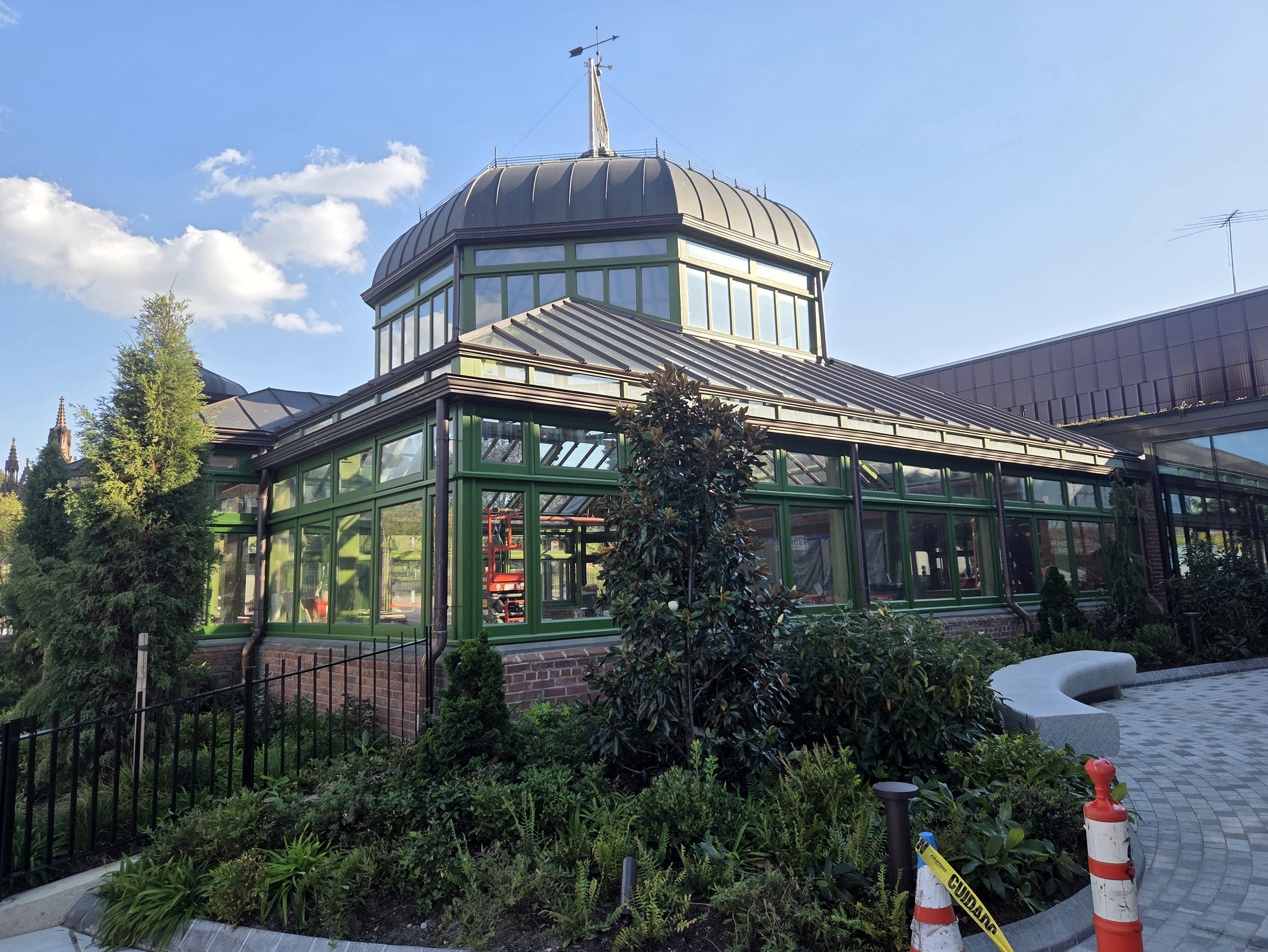
- Weir Greenhouse in 2025

- Location within New York City Location within New York Location within the United States
- Location: 750–751 5th Ave., New York, New York
- Coordinates: 40°39′32″N 73°59′47″W
- Area: less than one acre
- Built: 1895
- Architect: Gillespie, George Curtis
- Architectural style: Victorian commercial
- NRHP reference No.: 84002487
- NYSRHP No.: 04701.002508
- NYCL No.: 1197

Significant dates
- Added to NRHP: May 10, 1984
- Designated NYSRHP: April 3, 1984
- Designated NYCL: April 13, 1982

Weir Greenhouse is a historic greenhouse near Green-Wood Cemetery in Greenwood Heights and South Slope, Brooklyn, New York City. It was designed by George Curtis Gillespie and built in 1895 by James Weir Jr., a Brooklyn florist who had been in business for 50 years when he built the greenhouse for the business he operated with his son and grandson. It is a rectangular, wood frame and galvanized iron building with projecting bays and domes in the Victorian commercial style. The main entrance is set at an angle to the street corner and is octagonal in form. The rooftop features an octagonal cupola with a ball finial. Attached to the greenhouse is a one-story brick office structure.

The Weirs continued to operate the business until 1971, when they sold to the McGovern family. The greenhouse was made a New York City designated landmark in 1982. It was listed on the National Register of Historic Places in 1984. The greenhouse deteriorated severely over the years and was vandalized. The repair costs were estimated at $1 million by 2011.

On February 2, 2012, the Weir Greenhouse was purchased by the neighboring Green-Wood Cemetery, which planned to preserve the greenhouse and restore elements which have decayed in recent years. By early 2015, structural stabilization of the vacant, decayed building was complete, and the project was scheduled to move toward restoration of the building to its 1895 appearance. As of 2020, the restoration is still underway, but Green-Wood planned to convert the greenhouse into the cemetery's visitor center. Work on the visitor center began in 2023 and included an adjacent L-shaped building designed by Architecture Research Office. The visitor center was completed in 2026 and officially opened the weekend of April 18.

== See also ==
- List of New York City Designated Landmarks in Brooklyn
- National Register of Historic Places listings in Kings County, New York
