= Richard Brownlow =

English lawyer (1553–1638)

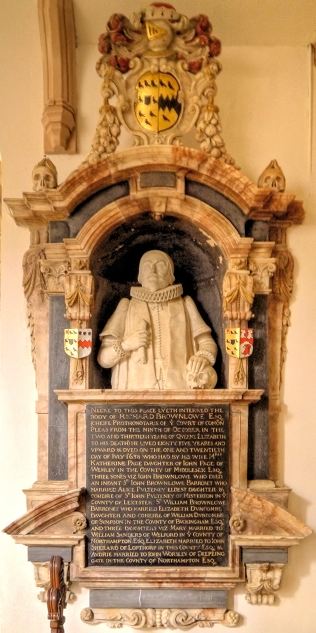
Mural monument to Richard Brownlow (1553–1638), St Peter and St Paul's Church, Belton, with his own arms on top and the arms of his two sons on either sides, all impaling the arms of their respective wives

Arms of Brownlow: Or, an escutcheon within an orle of martlets sable

Richard Brownlow (1553–1638) of Belton in Lincolnshire, was a lawyer who served as Chief Prothonotary of the Court of Common Pleas.

== Origins ==
He was born on 2 April 1553 and was baptised on 12 April at St. Andrew's Church, Holborn in the City of London. He was the son of John Brownlow of High Holborn, by his wife, a daughter of Sir John Zouch of Stoughton Grange in Leicestershire. A street in Holborn bears the name Brownlow Street.

== Career ==
In 1583 he entered the Inner Temple and was Treasurer of that society in 1606. On 9 October 1591 he was made Chief Prothonotary of the Court of Common Pleas, which office he continued to hold until his death, deriving from it an annual profit of £6,000, with which he purchased the reversion of the manor of Belton, near Grantham in Lincolnshire, with other properties.

== Marriage ==
He married Katherine Page, daughter of John Page of Wembley, Middlesex, a Master in Chancery and one of the first governors of Harrow School, and by her had three sons and three daughters, including:

- Sir John Brownlow, 1st Baronet (c. 1594–1679) of Belton, eldest son and heir, who on 26 July 1641 was created a baronet "of Belton in the County of Lincoln". Died without children when his baronetcy became extinct.
- Sir William Brownlow, 1st Baronet (c. 1595–1666) of Humby, Lincolnshire, who on 27 July 1641, one day after his brother's baronetcy, was also created a baronet, "of Humby in the County of Lincoln". In 1718 his great-grandson John Brownlow, 5th Baronet (1690–1754) was created Viscount Tyrconnel, in the Peerage of Ireland, whose sister and heiress in her issue Anne Brownlow married Sir Richard Cust, 2nd Baronet (1680–1734) and was the mother of Sir John Cust, 3rd Baronet (1718–1770), Speaker of the House of Commons, whose son in 1776 was created Baron Brownlow, the ancestor of Earl Brownlow.

== Death and burial ==
He died at Enfield on 21 July 1638 in his eighty-sixth year; his bowels were buried in Enfield Church, but his body was buried on 1 August in St Peter and St Paul's Church, Belton, in which survives his monument surmounted by a figure of him in his prothonotary's gown. The monument was created by Joshua Marshall. A portrait in similar dress is preserved at Belton House, and was engraved by Thomas Cross as frontispiece to his works. His will is dated 1 January 1637–8, and was proved 8 August 1638 by his two sons.

== Works ==
After his death various collections frnm his manuscripts were published, including:

- Reports of diverse Choice Cases of Law, taken by Richard Brownlow and John Goldesborough (1651)
- Reports (a second part of Diverse Choice Cases of Law) (1652)
- Declarations And Pleadings in English, 1652; 2nd part 1654; 3rd edition 1659.
- Writs Judicial (1663)
- Placita Latine Rediviva: a Book of Entries collected in the Times and out of some of the Manuscripts of those famous and learned prothonotaries Richard Brownlow, John Gulston, Robert Moyland, and Thomas Cory, by R. A. of Furnival's Inn, 1661; 3nd edition 1673.
- A Second Book of Judgements on Real, Personal, and Mixt Actions and upon the Statute; all or most of them affirmed upon Writs of Error. Being the collection of Mr. George Huxley of Lincoln's Inn, Kent., out of the choice manuscripts of Mr. Brownlowe and Mr. Moyle. &c., 1674.
- Latinè Redivivus: a Book of Entries of such Declarations, Information, Pleas in Bar, &c., contained in the first and second ports of the Declarations and Pleadings of Richard Brownlow, esq., late chief protonotary of the Court of Common Pleas (unskillfully turned into English and) printed in the years 1653 and 1654. Now published in Latin, their original Language, with additions (1693)
