= John Brownlow =

John Brownlow may refer to:

- Sir John Brownlow, 1st Baronet (c. 1595–1678) of the Brownlow baronets
- Sir John Brownlow, 3rd Baronet (1659–1697)
- John Brownlow, 1st Viscount Tyrconnel (1690–1754)
- John Brownlow (priest) (1805–1882), Irish Anglican priest
- John Bell Brownlow (1839–1922), Tennessee newspaper editor and public official

== See also ==
- Brownlow (surname)
