= William Brownlow =

William Brownlow may refer to:

- William Gannaway Brownlow (1805–1877), governor of Tennessee
- Sir William Brownlow, 1st Baronet (c. 1595–1666), English politician and barrister
- Sir William Brownlow, 4th Baronet (1665–1701), British Member of Parliament for Peterborough and Bishop's Castle
- William Brownlow (1683–1739) (1683–1711), Irish MP for Armagh County 1711–1739
- William Brownlow (1726–1794), Irish MP for Armagh County 1753–1794 and Strabane
- William Brownlow (1755–1815), Irish MP for Armagh County 1795–1798, British MP for Armagh
- William Brownlow, 3rd Baron Lurgan (1858–1937), Anglo-Irish aristocrat, landowner, hotel proprietor and sportsman
- William Brownlow (British Army officer) (1921–1998), British Army officer and MP for North Down
- William Brownlow (bishop) (1830–1901), English prelate of the Roman Catholic Church

== See also ==
- Brownlow baronets
- Brownlow (surname)
