= Sir Richard Brownlow, 2nd Baronet =

Arms of Brownlow: Or, an escutcheon within an orle of martlets sable

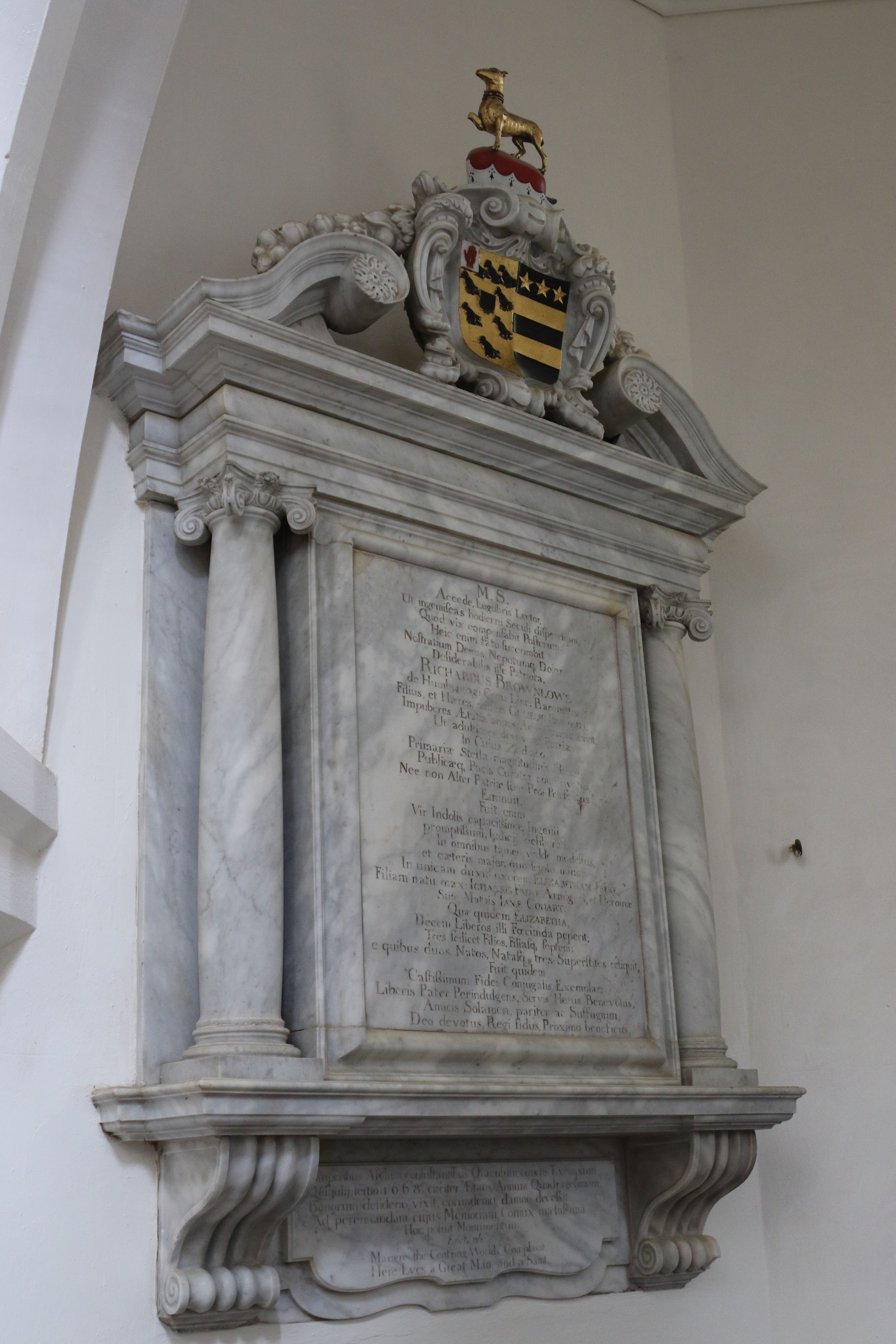
Monument to Sir Richard Brownlow, 2nd Baronet, Belton Church. Arms: Brownlow (Or, an escutcheon within an orle of martlets sable) impaling Freke (Sable, two bars or in chief three mullets of the last)

Sir Richard Brownlow, 2nd Baronet (died 1668) of Humby in Lincolnshire, was a landowner.

== Origins ==
He was the son and heir of Sir William Brownlow, 1st Baronet (c. 1595–1666) of Humby, younger brother of Sir John Brownlow, 1st Baronet (c. 1594–1679) of Belton, who died childless when his baronetcy became extinct. His mother was Elizabeth Duncombe, daughter of William Duncombe.

== Marriage and children ==
He married Elizabeth Freke, a daughter of John Freke of Stretton in Dorset, by whom he had children:

- Sir John Brownlow, 3rd Baronet (1659–1697), eldest son, builder of the surviving Belton House, having inherited the estate of Belton and others from his childless great-uncle Sir John Brownlow, 1st Baronet (c. 1594–1679) of Belton. He died leaving four daughters and co-heiresses, the youngest of whom married her first-cousin John Brownlow, 1st Viscount Tyrconnel, 5th Baronet (1690–1754), of Belton House, but left no children.
- Sir William Brownlow, 4th Baronet (1665–1701), the father of John Brownlow, 1st Viscount Tyrconnel, 5th Baronet (1690–1754), of Belton House, who in 1718 was raised to the Peerage of Ireland as Viscount Tyrconnel, but died childless.

Baronetage of England
Preceded by William Brownlow	Baronet (of Humby); 1666–1668	Succeeded by John Brownlow
