= Sir John Brownlow, 1st Baronet =

English sheriff (c. 1594–1679)

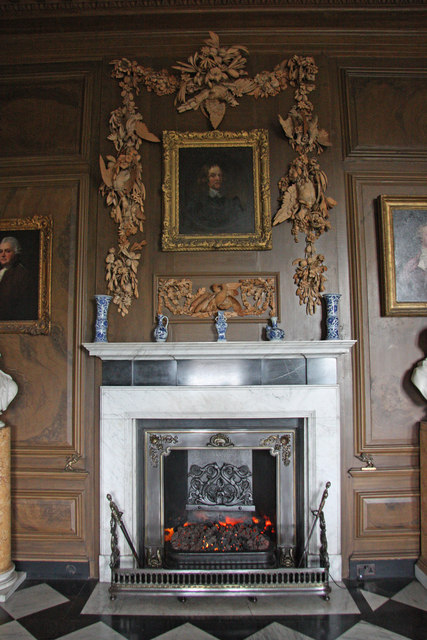
Sir John Brownlow, 1st Baronet, portrait at Belton House, surrounded by carving by Grinling Gibbons

Arms of Brownlow: Or, an escutcheon within an orle of martlets sable

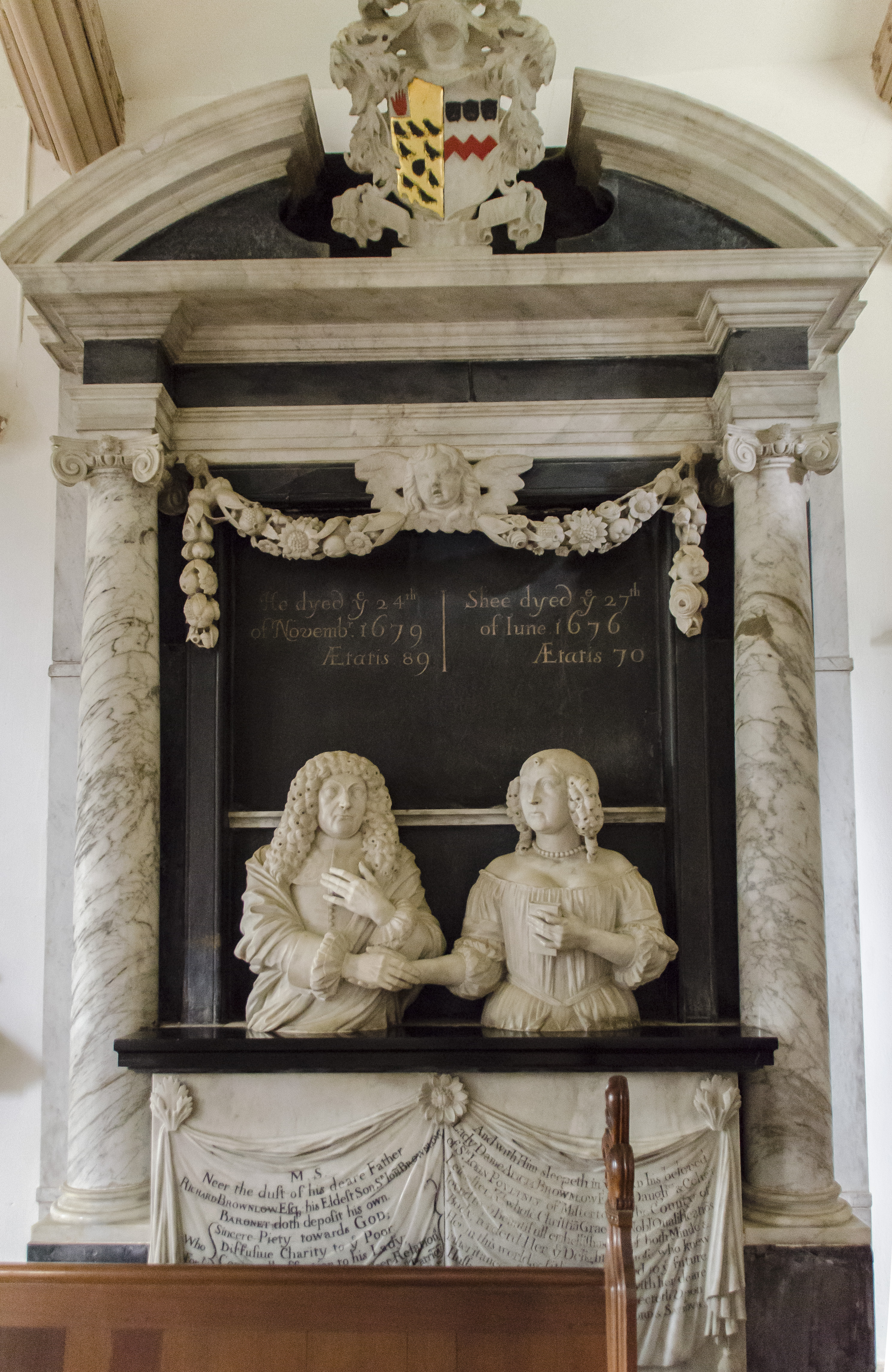
Monument to Sir John Brownlow, 1st Baronet, with his wife Alice Poultney, St Peter and St Paul's Church, Belton. Above are shown the arms of Brownlow impaling Poultney

Sir John Brownlow, 1st Baronet (c. 1594–24 November 1679) of Belton, near Grantham in Lincolnshire, was twice Sheriff of Lincolnshire and on 26 July 1641 was created a baronet "of Belton in the County of Lincoln". He died without progeny when his baronetcy became extinct. His monument survives in St Peter and St Paul's Church, Belton, showing half statues of himself and his wife finely sculpted in white marble.

== Origins ==
He was born about 1594, the eldest son and heir of Richard Brownlow (1553–1638) of Belton in Lincolnshire, Chief Prothonotary of the Court of Common Pleas, by his wife Katherine Page, daughter of John Page of Wembley, Middlesex, a Master in Chancery and one of the first governors of Harrow School. His younger brother was Sir William Brownlow, 1st Baronet (c. 1595–1666) of Humby, Lincolnshire, who on 27 July 1641, one day after his brother's baronetcy, was also created a baronet, "of Humby in the County of Lincoln", whose great-grandson John Brownlow, 5th Baronet (1690–1754) was in 1718 created Viscount Tyrconnel, in the Peerage of Ireland, whose sister and heiress in her issue Anne Brownlow married Sir Richard Cust, 2nd Baronet and was the mother of Sir John Cust, 3rd Baronet (1718–1770), Speaker of the House of Commons, whose son in 1776 was created Baron Brownlow, the ancestor of Earl Brownlow, of Belton House.

== Career ==
He inherited the manor of Belton, Lincolnshire which his father had purchased, and was selected High Sheriff of Lincolnshire in 1640 and 1665.

== Marriage ==
He married Alice Poultney (1606 – 27 June 1676), second daughter and co-heiress of Sir John Poulteney (1585–1617) (or Pulteney) of Misterton in Leicestershire, a Member of Parliament for Wigan in Lancashire in 1601 and 1604, by his wife Margery Fortescue (d.1613), a daughter of Sir John Fortescue (c.1531–1607) of Salden, near Mursley, Buckinghamshire, Chancellor of the Exchequer. The marriage was without progeny. They adopted their niece, Alice Sherard, in 1668. Alice, Lady Brownlow, had almshouses for six women built in 1659.

== Death and succession ==
He died on 24 November 1679, aged 89, as is recorded on his monument in Belton Church. As he died without progeny his baronetcy became extinct. His heir to his property was his eldest great-nephew Sir John Brownlow, 3rd Baronet (1659–1697) of Humby, Lincolnshire, who having inherited from him the manor of Belton, built the surviving grand mansion Belton House.

== Monument in Belton Church ==
His monument in St Peter and St Paul's Church, Belton, comprising half statues of himself and his wife finely carved in white marble, is inscribed as follows:

He dyed 24th Nov 1679 aet(atis) 89. Shee dyed 27th Jun 1676 aet(atis) 70. M(emoriae) S(acrum) Neer the dust of his deare Father Richard Brownlow Esquire: his Eldest Son Sir John Brownlow Baronet doth deposit his own. Who for his Sincere Piety towards God; Diffusive Charity to the Poor, Conjugall affection to his Lady; Love and Liberality to his neer Relations; With his Prudent Improvement of his Paternall Patrimony; May be a fair pattern to this and After Ages to follow. And with Him sleepeth in the Lord his beloved Lady Dame Alicia Brownlow Eldest Daughter and Coheir of Sir John Poultney of Misterton in the County of Leicester, Knight, whose Christian Graces and Noble Qualifications joyned to the Beautifull embellishments of both Minde and body, renderd Her the Delight of those who knew Her in this world, and fitly capacitated to the future inheritance of a Better, which she with her deare Husband most fiducially here expecteth Upon the re appearance of Our blessed Lord and Saviour.
