= Brownlow baronets =

Extinct baronetcy in the Baronetage of England

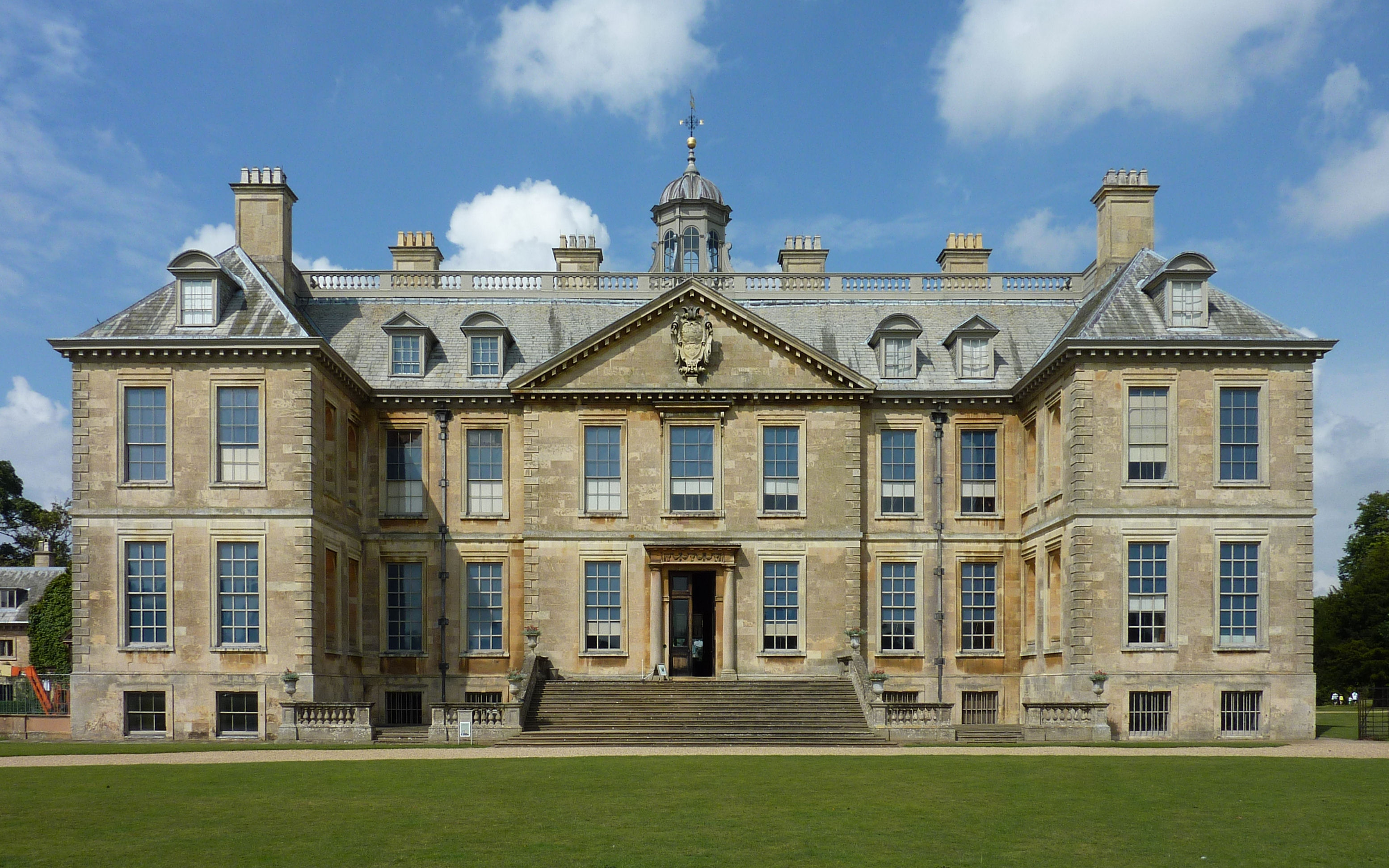
Belton House, the seat of the Brownlow family

There have been two baronetcies created for members of the Brownlow family, both in the Baronetage of England. Both titles are now extinct.

The Brownlow Baronetcy, of Belton in the County of Lincolnshire, was created in the Baronetage of England on 26 July 1641 for John Brownlow. The title became extinct on his death in 1679.

The Brownlow Baronetcy, of Humby in the County of Lincolnshire, was created in the Baronetage of England on 27 July 1641 for William Brownlow. He was the younger brother of the 1st Baronet of Belton, created a baronet one day before. For more information on this creation, see Viscount Tyrconnel.

The ancestral seat of the Brownlow family was Belton House in Lincolnshire, built by Sir John Brownlow, 3rd Baronet, of Humby (1659–1697)

== Brownlow baronets, of Belton (1641) ==
- Sir John Brownlow, 1st Baronet (c. 1595–1678)

== Brownlow baronets, of Humby (1641) ==
- see Viscount Tyrconnel

== See also ==
- Baron Brownlow
- Baron Lurgan, held by the Brownlows of Lurgan, County Armagh.
