= Brownlow =

Brownlow may refer to:

== People ==
- Baron Brownlow, a title in the Peerage of Great Britain
- Brownlow baronets, two Baronetcies
- Adelbert Brownlow-Cust, 3rd Earl Brownlow (1844–1921), British soldier and politician
- Charles Brownlow, 1st Baron Lurgan (1795–1847), Anglo-Irish politician
- Charles Brownlow, 2nd Baron Lurgan (1831–1882), Anglo-Irish politician
- Charles Henry Brownlow (1831–1916), senior Indian Army officer
- Chas Brownlow (1861–1924), Australian rules football administrator for whom the Brownlow Medal is named
- David Brownlow, sound engineer
- James Patton Brownlow (1842–1879), American military officer and railway superintendent
- John Bell Brownlow (1839–1922), American political staffer
- Kevin Brownlow (born 1938), British filmmaker and film historian
- Louis Brownlow (1879–1963), American political scientist and consultant on public administration; chairman of the Brownlow Committee
- Peregrine Cust, 6th Baron Brownlow (1899–1978), British peer
- Richard Brownlow (1553–1638), Chief Prothonotary of the Court of Common Pleas at Westminster
- Walter P. Brownlow (1851–1910), American politician
- William Brownlow (1726–1794), Anglo-Irish politician
- Parson Brownlow (1805–1877), American journalist, clergyman and politician

Fictional characters:

- Mr. Brownlow, from Charles Dickens's novel Oliver Twist
- Charles Brownlow (The Bill), from the TV series The Bill

== Places ==
- Brownlow, West Virginia, a place in the United States
- Brownlow, Cheshire, a location in the United Kingdom
- Brownlow, St Helens, a location in the United Kingdom
- Brownlow, South Australia, a locality in Australia
- Brownlow Ki, South Australia, a locality on Kangaroo Island in Australia

== See also ==
- Brownlow Committee, a 1937 American committee on government administration, chaired by Louis Brownlow
- Brownlow Medal, an award in the Australian Football league, named for Chas Brownlow
