= St Peter and St Paul's Church, Belton =

Coordinates: 52.9451°N 0.6177°W

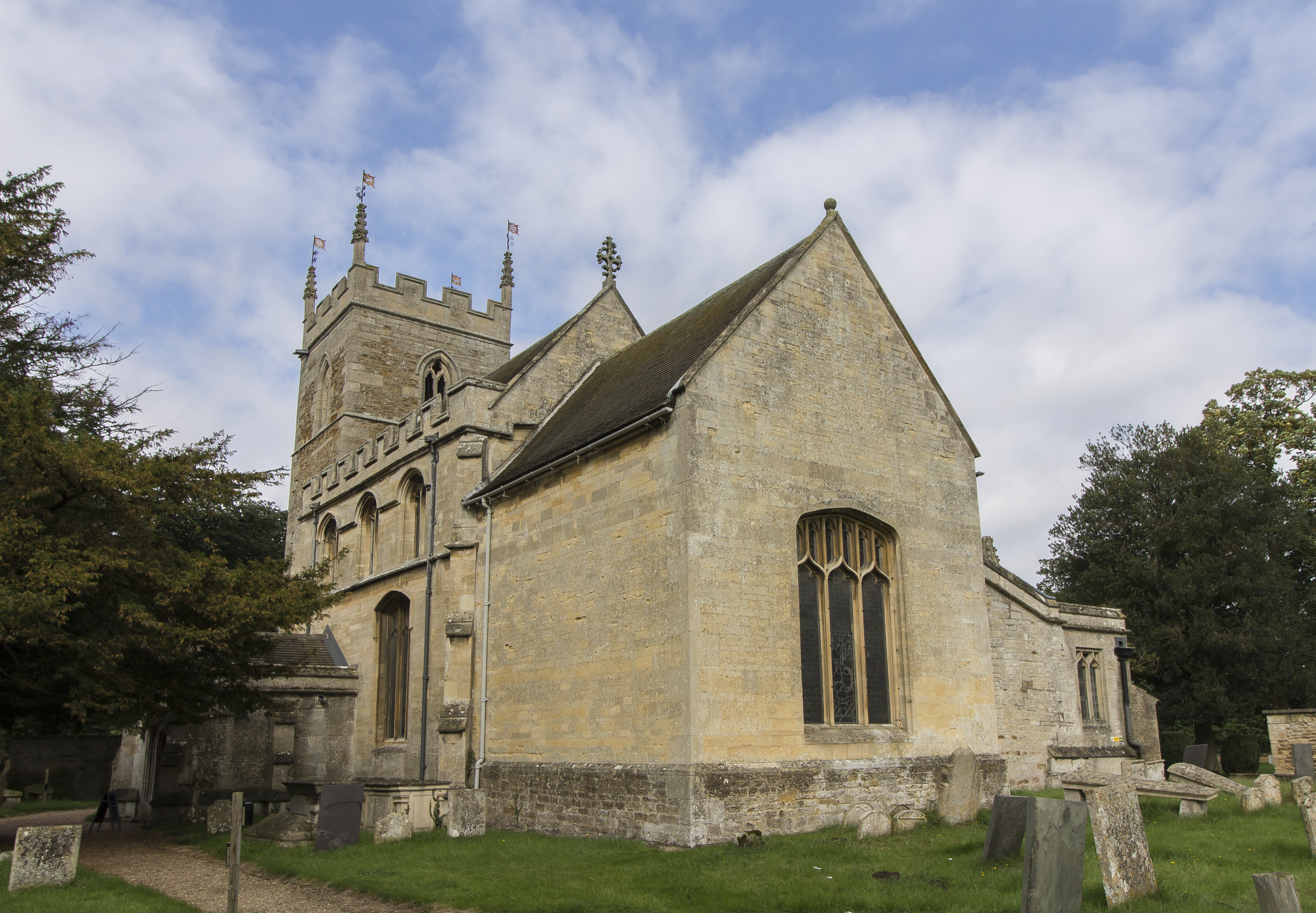
- St Peter and St Paul's Church, Belton

- Location in Lincolnshire
- OS grid reference: SK 92983 39533
- Location: Belton, South Kesteven, Lincolnshire
- Country: England
- Denomination: Anglican

History
- Dedication: St Peter & St Paul

Architecture
- Functional status: Church of England parish church
- Heritage designation: Grade I
- Designated: 20 September 1951
- Architectural type: Church
- Style: Perpendicular Gothic
- Groundbreaking: 13th/14th century

Administration
- Diocese: Lincoln
- Archdeaconry: Boston

The Church of St Peter and St Paul, Belton, South Kesteven, Lincolnshire is a functioning parish church and a Grade I listed building. Since the 17th century, the church has served as the estate church for Belton House and it holds a notable collection of funerary monuments commemorating members of the Brownlow family.

== History ==
The church dates from around 1200, with later elements dating from the 14th century. From the mid-17th century, the church became closely associated with the Brownlow family of Belton House, which stands to the immediate south of the church. Although the house had its own chapel, the church became the resting place for generations of the family and in the early 19th century Jeffry Wyattville was commissioned to construct a mausoleum. The church holds a large collection of funerary monuments commemorating members of the Brownlow family, covering a period of nearly 400 years.

St Peter and St Paul's remains an active church in the ecclesiastical parish of Belton, in the Deanery of Loveden, and the Diocese of Lincoln. In 2021 the church secured funding from the National Lottery Heritage Fund, and from its own fundraising activities, to enable the restoration of its set of five bells.

== Architecture and description ==
The oldest part of the church is the 12th-century tower. The building was extended in the 14th century, and again in the 18th, and then subject to considerable reconstruction and restoration, including the Brownlow mortuary chapel by Jeffry Wyattville in the 19th. Nicholas Antram, in his 2002 revised Lincolnshire in the Pevsner Buildings of England series, describes the church as "badly over-restored" and "brimfull of Brownlow and Cust monuments".

The monuments to the Brownlows and Custs were often undertaken by the leading artists of the time, and include examples of work by William Stanton, Antonio Canova, Sir Henry Cheere, John Bacon the Elder, William Theed the Younger, Sir Richard Westmacott, Carlo Marochetti and Nina Cust. (Note: Emmeline Mary Elizabeth Welby-Gregory, known as 'Nina', was a noted sculptor who entered into the Brownlow family on her marriage to Harry Cust. The memorial to her husband at St Peter and St Paul's is her work.) The churchyard contains the chest tomb of Adelbert Cust, 5th Baron Brownlow, designed by Sir Edwin Lutyens.

St Peter and St Paul's is a Grade I listed building.

== Gallery ==
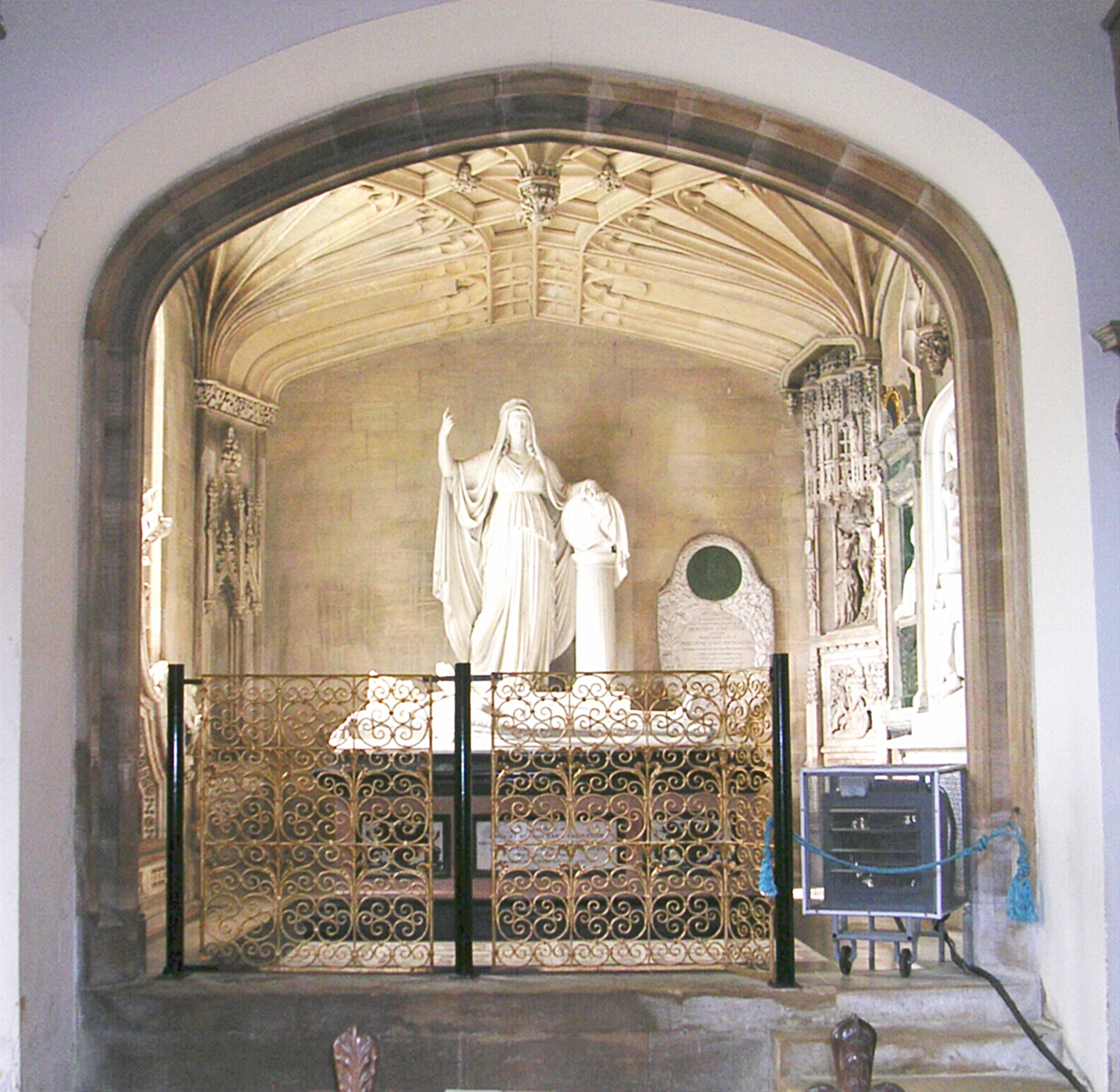
The Brownlow funerary chapel by Jeffry Wyattville, with the monument to Sophia, Lady Brownlow by Antonio Canova

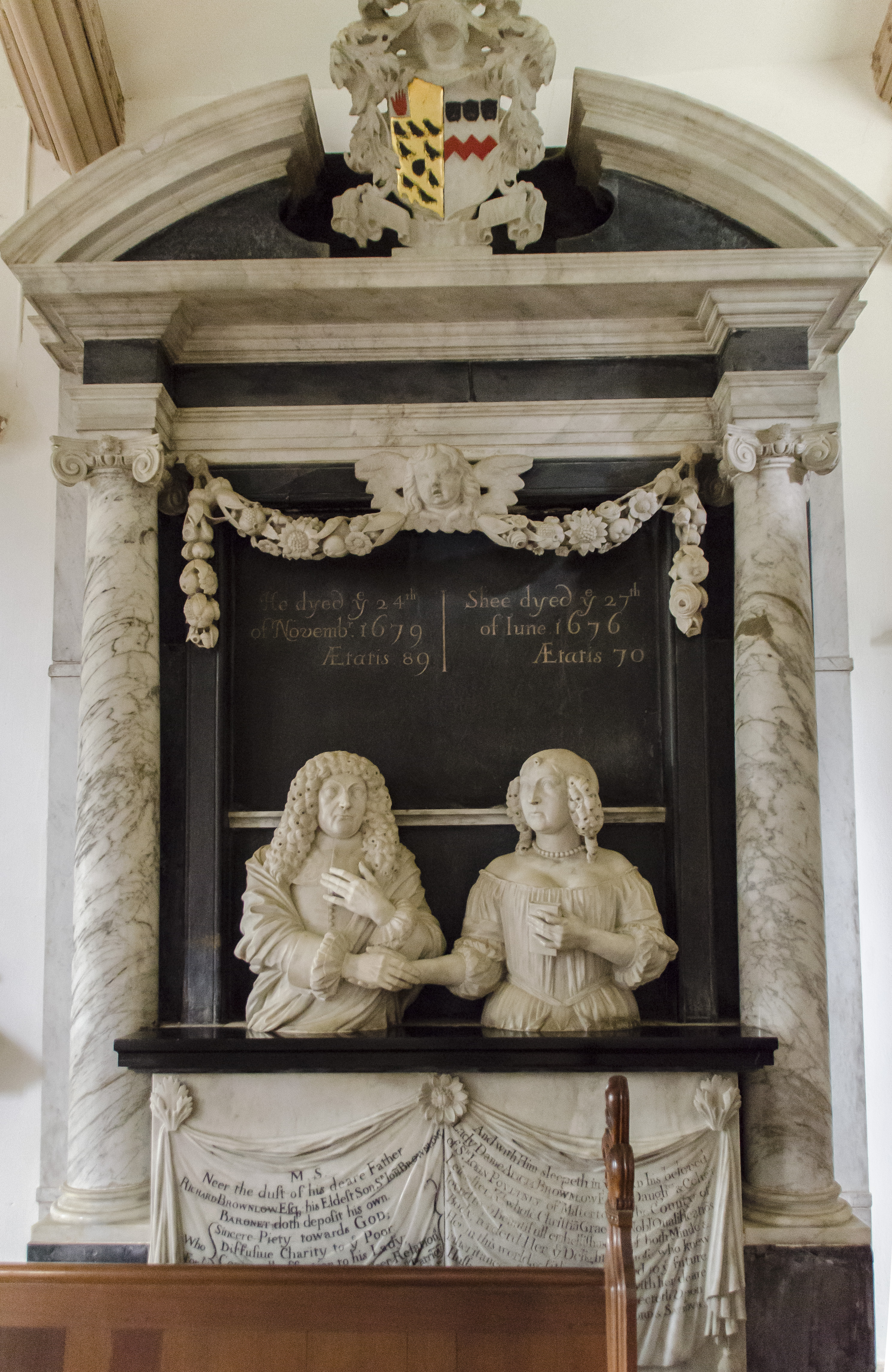
Monument to Sir John Brownlow, 1st Baronet and his wife, Alice Poultney

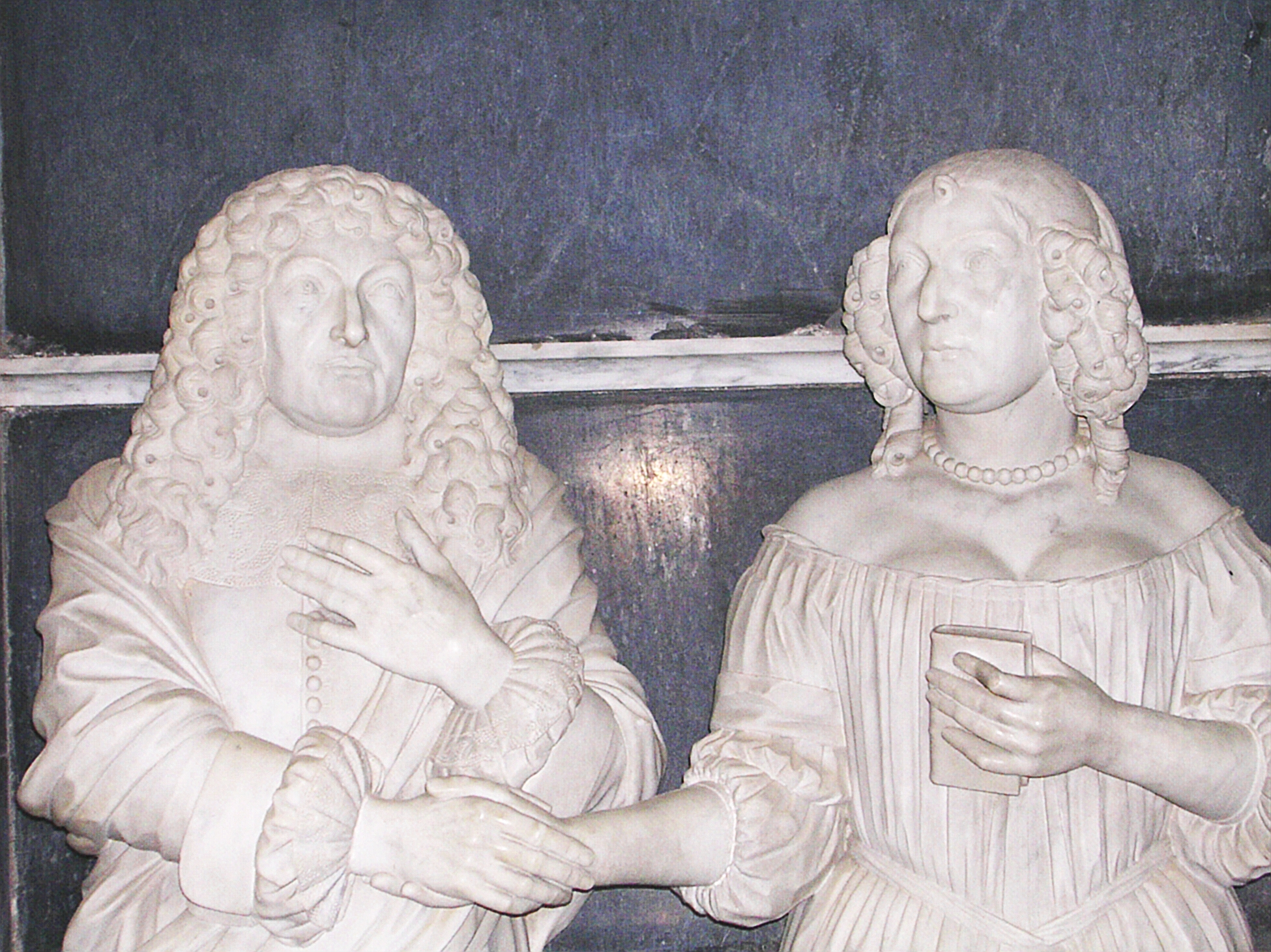
Detail

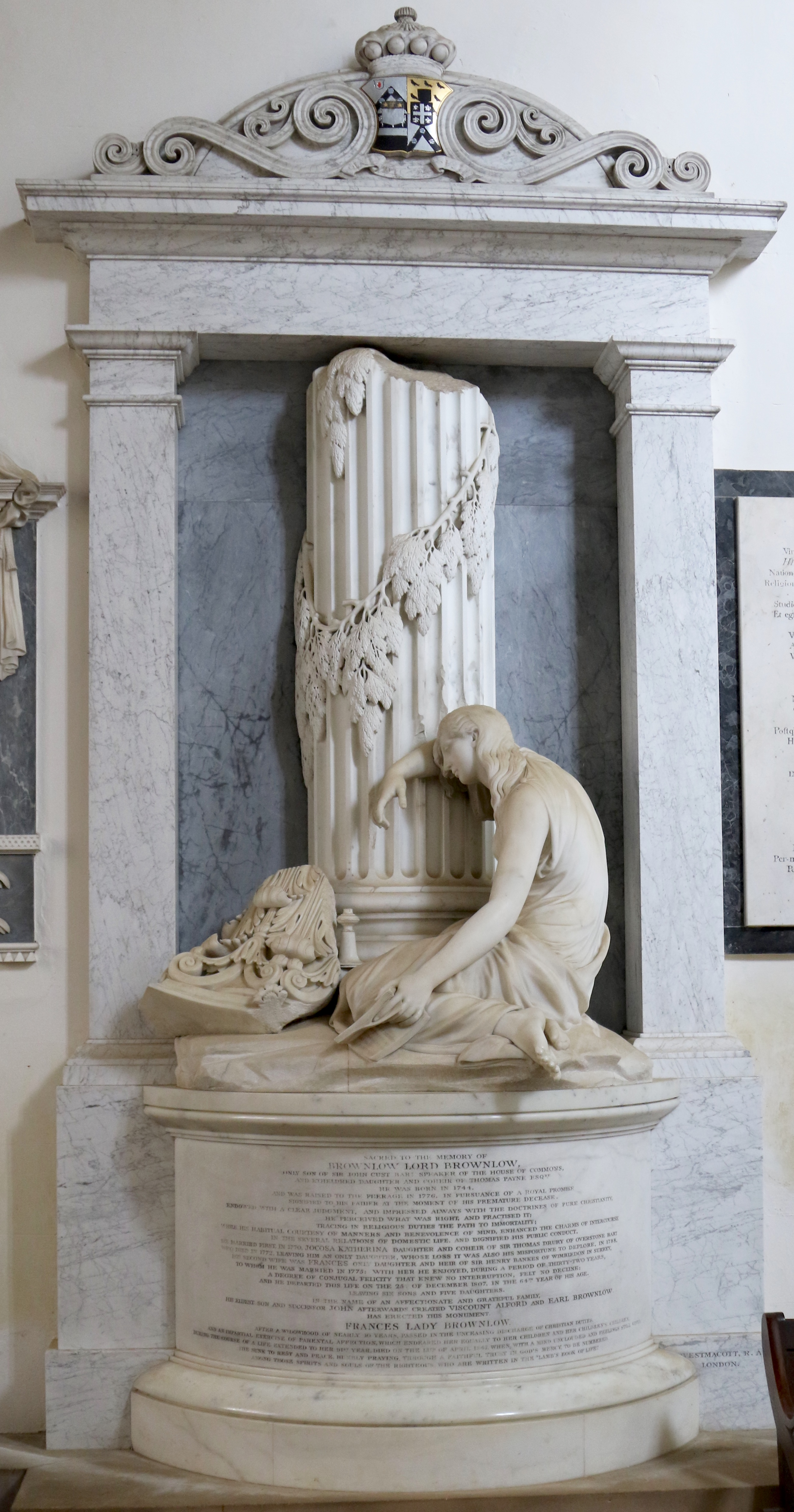
Memorial to Brownlow Cust, 1st Baron Brownlow by Richard Westmacott

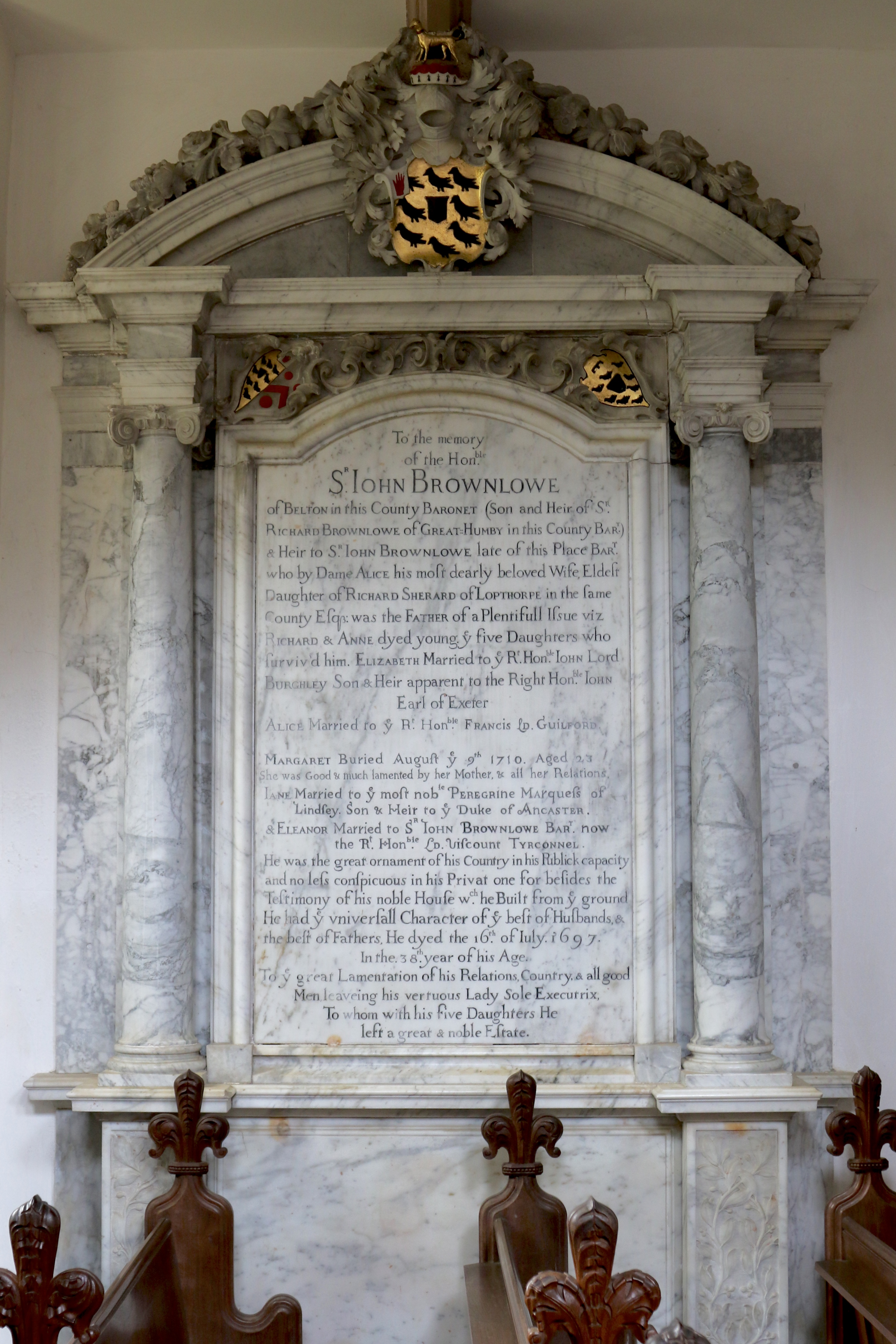
Memorial to Sir John Brownlow, 3rd Baronet

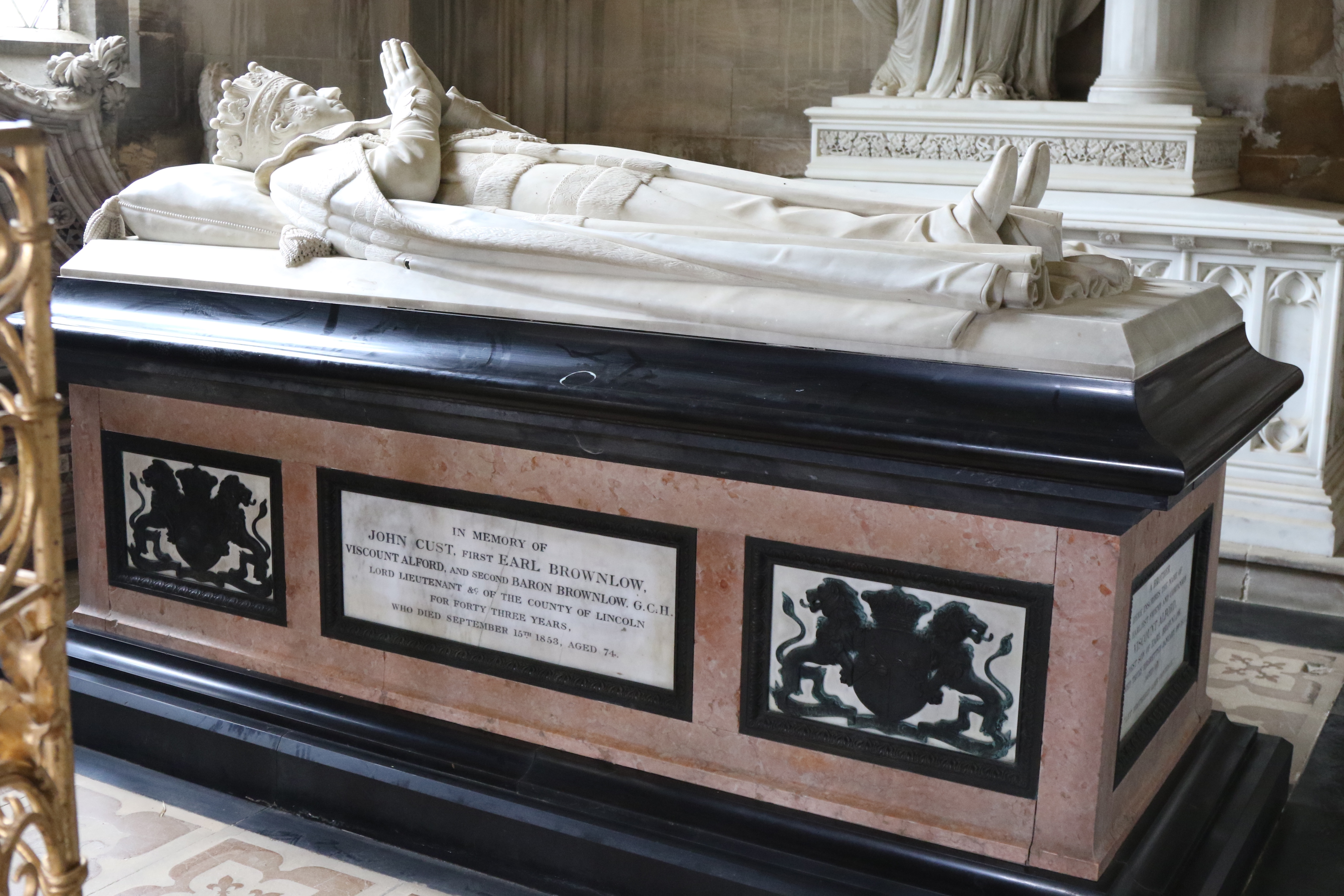
Memorial to John Cust, 1st Earl Brownlow by Carlo Marochetti

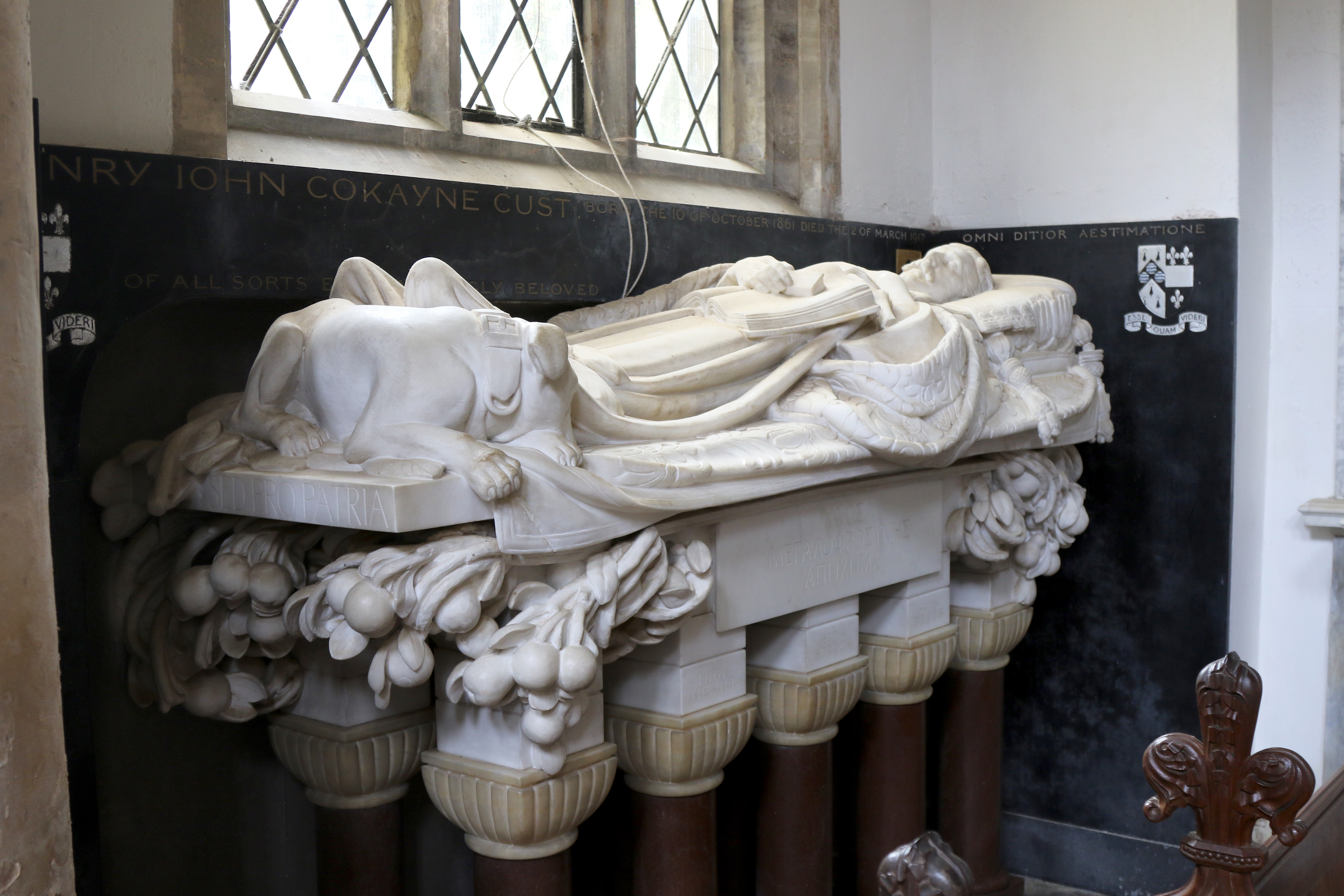
Memorial to Henry John 'Harry' Cockayne Cust by Emmeline Cust

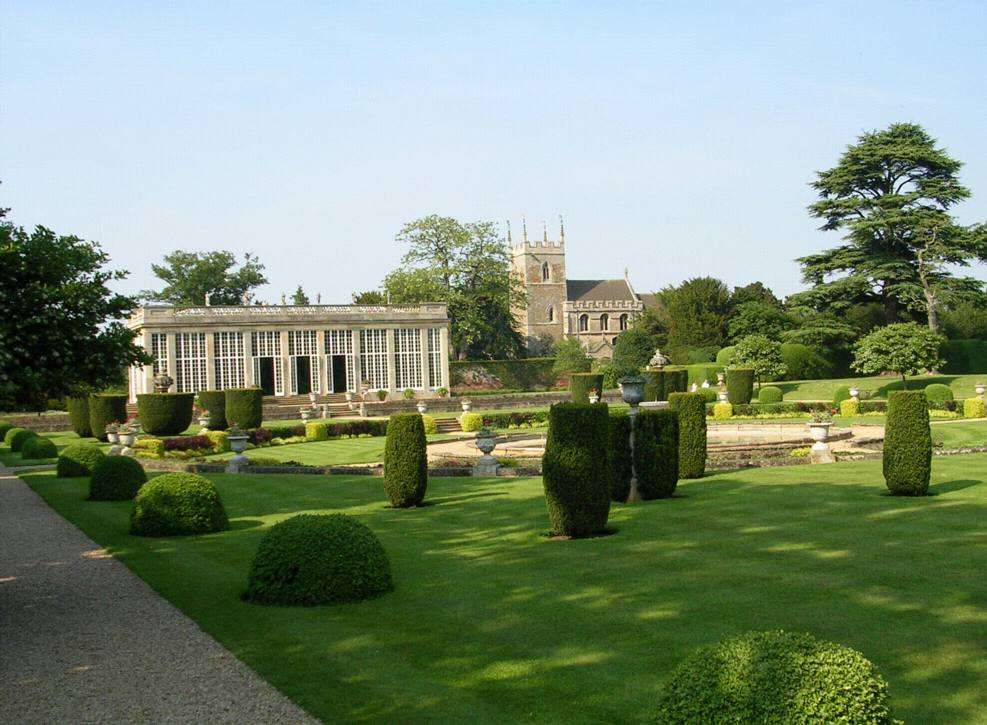
The church from the Italian Garden at Belton House

== Sources ==
- Greeves, Lydia (2008). Houses of the National Trust. London, UK: National Trust Books. ISBN 978-1-905-40066-9.
- Pevsner, Nikolaus; Harris, John; Antram, Nicholas (2002). Lincolnshire. The Buildings of England. New Haven and London: Yale University Press. ISBN 978-0-300-09620-0.
