= John Goldesburg =

John Goldesburg or Goldesborough or Gouldsborough (1568–1618), legal reporter, descended from a family living at Goldsborough, West Riding of Yorkshire, was born on 18 October 1568. He studied at Oxford in 1584, entered the Middle Temple, and was called to the bar by that society. He enjoyed a good reputation as a lawyer, and was made one of the prothonotaries of the common pleas. He died 9 October 1618, and was buried near the high altar in the Temple Church.

After his death there were published:

- Reports of Divers Choice Cases in Law taken by those late and most Judicious Prothonotaries of the Common Pleas, Richard Brownlow and John Goldesborough, Esquires, with directions how to proceed in many intricate actions, &c., 1651; 3rd edition, 2 parts, 1675.
- Reports of that Learned and Judicious Clerk, J. Gouldsborough, Esq., sometimes one of the Protonotaries of the Court of Common Pleas, or his collection of choice cases and matters agitated in all the Courts at Westminster in the latter yeares of the Reign of Queen Elizabeth, with learned arguments at the Bar and on the Bench, and the grave Resolutions and Judgments thereupon of the Chief Justices, Anderson and Popham, and the rest of the Judges of those times. Never before published, and now printed by his original copy … by M. S. (M. A. Shepperd) of the Inner Temple, Esq., 1653 (a copy in the British Museum has manuscript notes by Francis Hargrave).

The prefaces to these works describe the attainments of Goldesburg in high terms; on the other hand, North says (Discourse on the Study of the Laws): "Godbolt, Gouldsborough, and March, mean reporters, but not to be neglected".
