= William Bruges =

English officer of arms (c. 1375–1450)

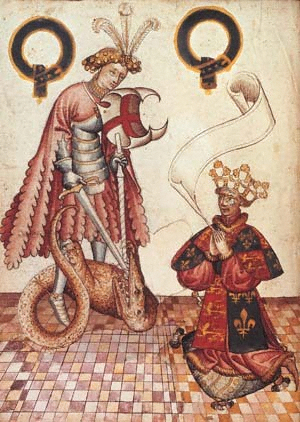
William Bruges kneeling before St George, first illumination in the Bruges Garter Book made by Bruges c. 1430–1440

Arms of Bruges: ermine, a cross quarter pierced ermines

William Bruges (c. 1375 – 9 March 1450) was an English officer of arms. He is best remembered as the first person appointed to the post of Garter King of Arms, which is currently the highest heraldic office in England.

== Origins ==
William Bruges was the son of Richard Bruges, Lancaster King of Arms, and his wife Katherine. The younger Bruges was appointed Chester Herald on 7 June 1398. He was later attached to the household of Henry of Monmouth, then Prince of Wales, Earl of Chester, and Duke of Aquitaine.

It is believed that Bruges was promoted to Guyenne King of Arms on the accession of Henry V and was sent to France in that capacity in early 1414. In February 1416, as Aquitaine King of Arms, Bruges was sent to emperor-elect, Sigismund, on royal business. At this time, the titles of Aquitaine and Guyenne were interchangeable.

== Garter King of Arms ==
The position of King of Arms of the Order of the Garter, usually known as Garter King of Arms, was created sometime around 1415, and Bruges appointed to it. His father's will, dated July 1415, refers to William Bruges as both Guyenne and Garter King of Arms. After this, the next mention of Bruges in the position is 13 September 1417. It was the first time a king of arms had been specifically appointed for the service of an order of chivalry. By virtue of this office, he held permanent authority over the provincial kings of arms.

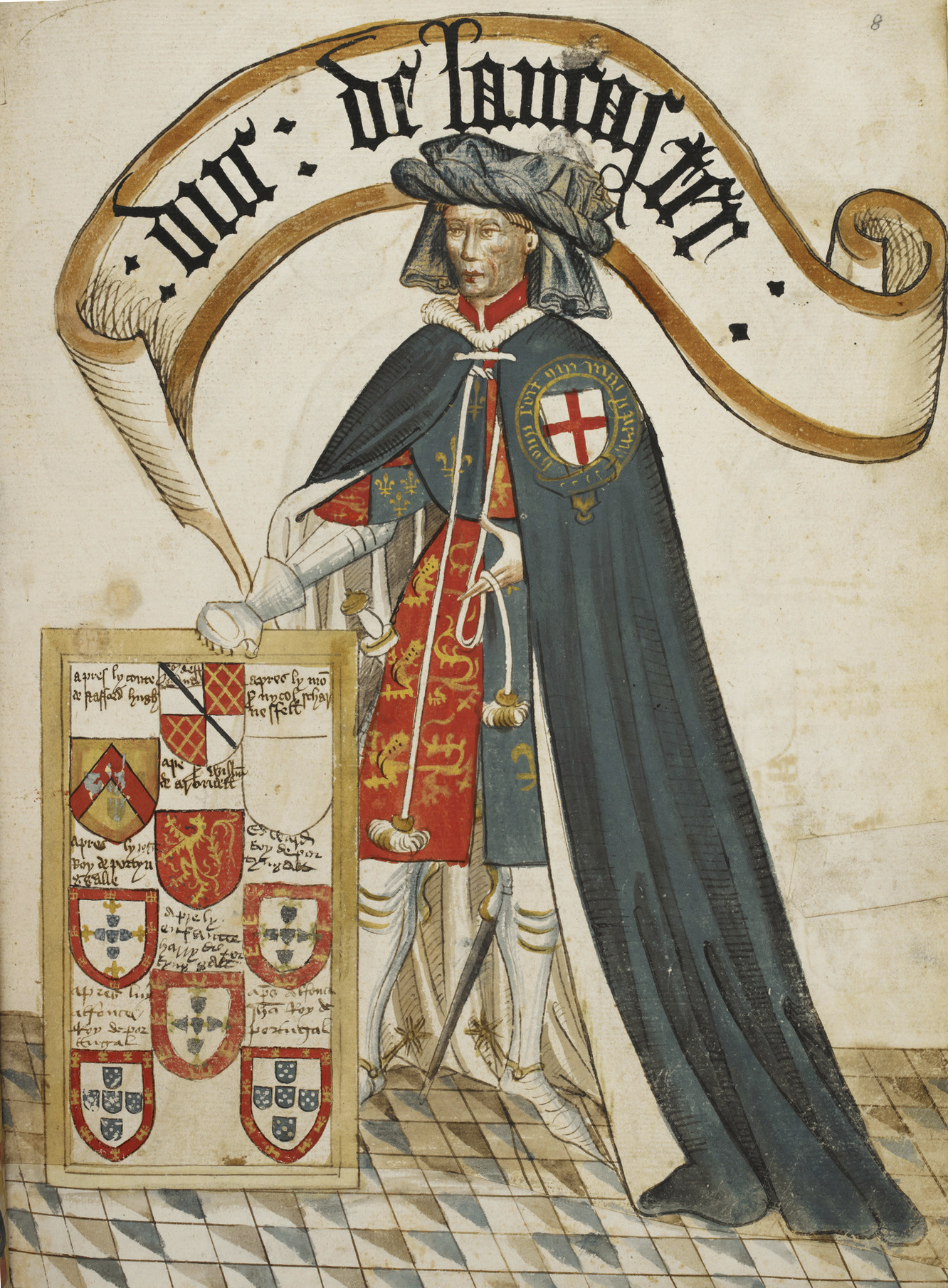
Illustration from the 1430 Garter Book made by William Bruges, showing Henry of Grosmont, 1st Duke of Lancaster (d. 1361), the second ever recipient of the Order

Bruges's appointment as the first Garter King of Arms coincided with a series of moves to regulate heraldic matters. On 2 June 1417, King Henry V clamped down on the unauthorized wearing of coat armour, issuing a writ to sheriffs directing that "no one, of whatsoever state, grade or condition he may be shall assume such arms or coats of arms unless he has or ought to have the same by right of his ancestors or by the gift of some person having sufficient power for this purpose," and providing penalties to violators of the law.

. In September the duke of Clarence ruled on matters of precedence between the heralds and the serjeants-at-arms. In January 1421 the English heralds held their first chapter and directed that a common seal for that office be made. Resolutions were to govern the office of arms and its members, with chapters summoned by Garter. In the same year, as part of Henry's revival of the Order of the Garter, some statutes of the order were revised and at about the same time many heraldic stall plates of former companions were set up in St. George's Chapel, Windsor. Bruges was also responsible for producing his Bruges Garter Book around 1430, which is the earliest known armorial of the order.

In 1421 Bruges took part in the coronation of Queen Catherine, and in the following year he officiated at Henry V's funeral. Under Henry VI there was scarcely a year in which he was not sent on at least one mission, sometimes staying abroad for many months. He was usually concerned with France, but he also visited Normandy and Brittany, Flanders, Hainault and Holland, Scotland, Spain, Portugal, and Italy.

== Rebuilds St George's Church, Stamford ==
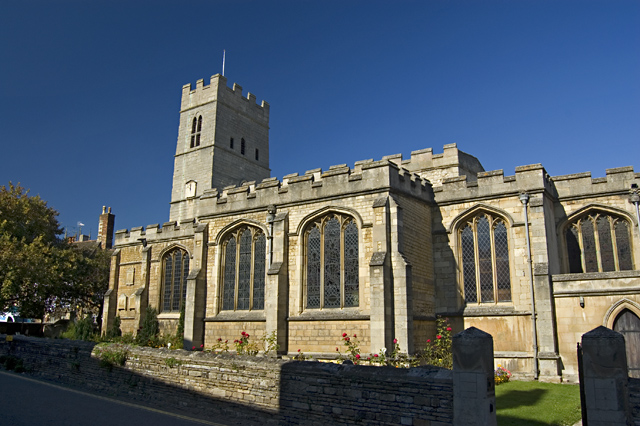
St George's Church, Stamford, built by William Bruges, viewed from south

In about 1450 he rebuilt at his own cost St George's Church in the town of Stamford, in Lincolnshire. In the chancel he set up a series of stained glass windows, at the east end and on either side of the choir, depicting the 25 Founder Knights of the Order of the Garter and of King Edward III the Sovereign of the Order and of St George, the patron saint. When Elias Ashmole (1617–1692) visited the church in 1664 he reported concerning the stained glass images "I found so broken and defaced that no tolerable draft of them could be taken fit to exhibit to the reader's satisfaction". John Anstis (1669-1744) reported that only the images of the king and three knights remained. Little remains of the windows today apart from a collection of garter panes in the north chancel window and a few fragments in the south window. However the structure of the church built by Bruges remains intact.

== Marriage and children ==
He married, before 1415, Agnes Haddon, by whom he had three daughters including:

- Katherine Bruges, who married John Smert, who succeeded her father as Garter King of Arms.

== Death and burial ==
Bruges died on 9 March 1450 on his sizeable estate in Kentish Town. He was buried in St George's Church, Stamford, the church he rebuilt and to which he bequeathed much property and vessels of gold and silver.

== See also ==
- College of Arms

== Sources ==
Citations

Bibliography

- Mark Noble, A History of the College of Arms. (London, 1805).
- Walter H Godfrey and Sir Anthony Wagner, The College of Arms, Queen Victoria Street: being the sixteenth and final monograph of the London Survey Committee. (London, 1963).
- Hugh Stanford London, The life of William Bruges, The First Garter King of Arms. Harleian Society. (London, 1970), 111–12.
- Sir Anthony Wagner. Heralds of England: a History of the Office and College of Arms. (London, 1967).
- Sir Anthony Wagner. A Catalogue of English Mediaeval Rolls of Arms. Harleian Society (London, 1950), 100.
- P. J. Begent. The Creation of the Office of Garter King of Arms. Coat of Arms, New Series Vol 11 No 172 (1995), 134–40.

Heraldic offices
New title	Garter King of Arms; 1415–1450	Succeeded by John Smert
