= St George's Church, Stamford =

Church in South Kesteven, Lincolnshire, England

Coordinates: 52.6517°N 0.4759°W

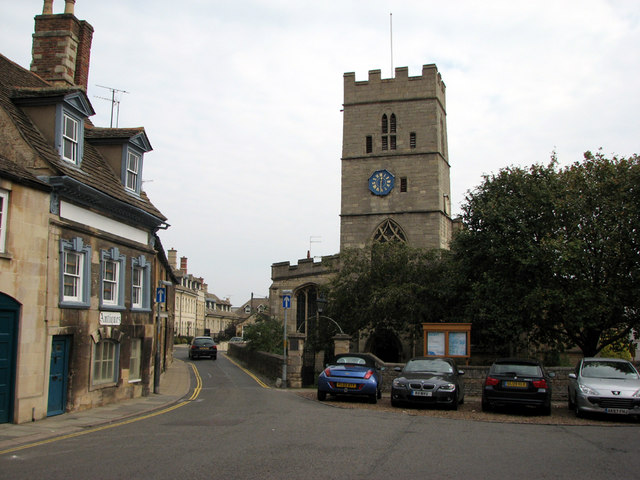
St George's Church from the west

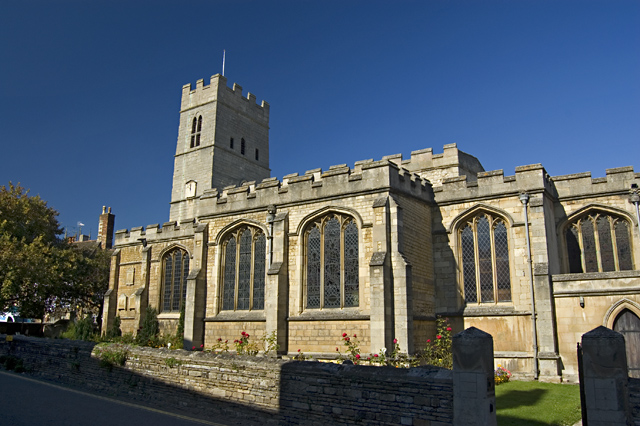
St George's Church from the south-east

St George's Church is a Grade I listed building in Stamford, Lincolnshire, England.

== History ==
A major benefactor of the church was William Bruges (1375–1450), the first Garter King of Arms who is buried in the church. St George's claims to be the original church of the Order of the Garter. Originally the chancel contained a series of seven windows containing portraits of the Knights of the Garter, but little remains apart from a collection of garter panes in the north chancel window and a few fragments in the south window including the centre panes of St Catherine and St Anne. The roof of the chancel with decorative angels was also the gift of Bruges. The central angels on each side carry on their shields the "Signs of the Passion", the pierced heart, and wounded hands and feet of Christ.

There are numerous memorial tablets adorning the inside of the church including one commemorating Tobie Norris (d. 1626) after whom a Stamford pub is named, Sir Richard Cust, 2nd Baronet, and Blanche, Lady Wake (d. 1379). In the south aisle, there is a Hugh Arnold stained glass window (1909) to the memory of architect John Charles Traylen.

The church's tower was probably built in the early 13th century when the first rector was ordained and is mostly original except for the top section, which was rebuilt in the 17th century. The nave has some of the original 13th-century columns as well as 14th- and 15th-century expansions. The interior of the church was subject to Victorian restoration when pews were removed, a new pulpit built, and the floor was re-laid.

In 1949 Bowman & Sons supplied a George & Dragon figure by Mahomet Thomas Phillips for the church's Second World War memorial.

=== Rectory ===
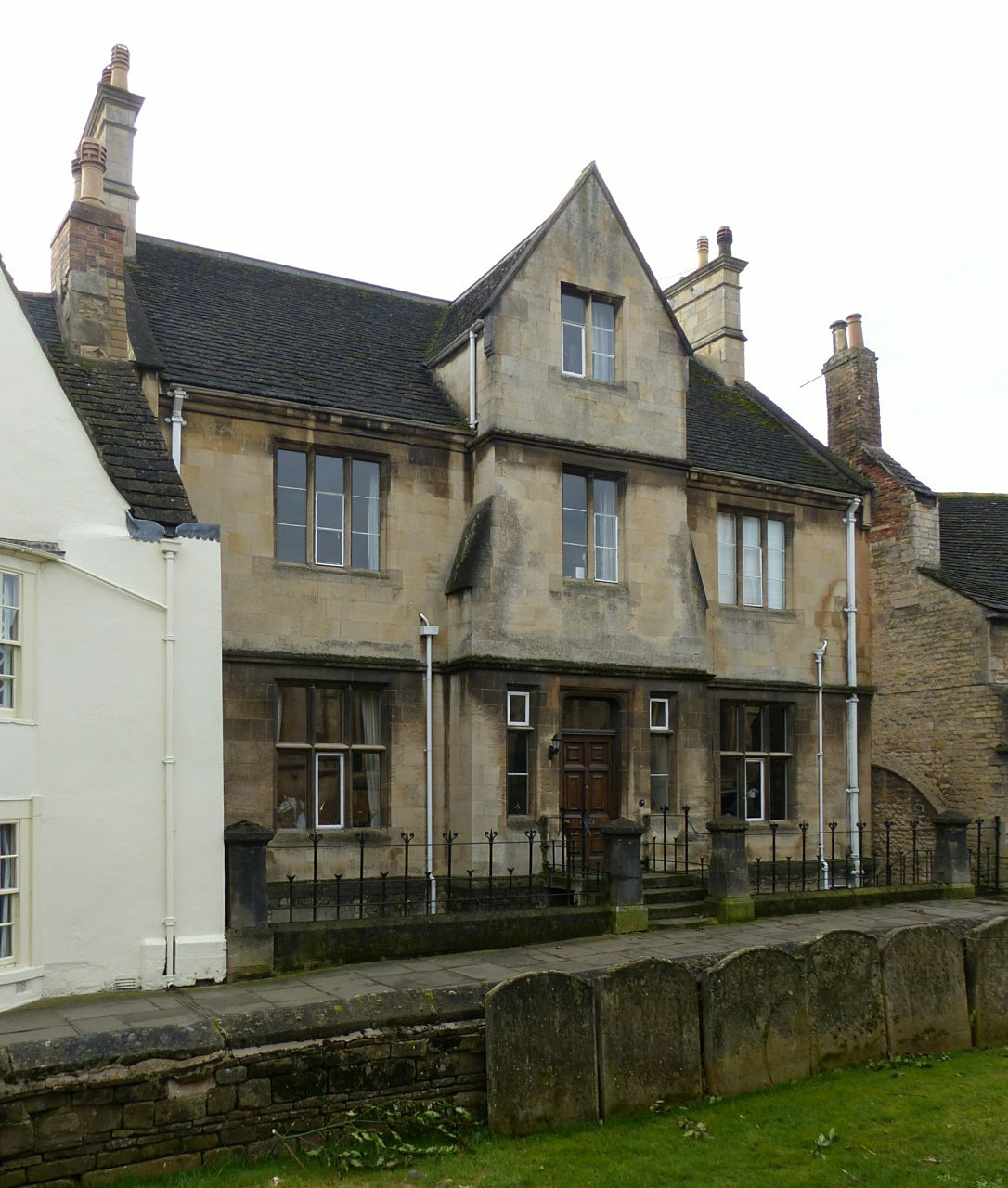
St George's Rectory

The Rectory is located at 16, St George's Square. Dating from 1881, it was designed by Edward Browning.

== Incumbents ==
Name	Date
Robert Peck	1225
Thomas De Gerund	1226
Ralph De Stok	1229
Philip De Riston	1288
John De Ferriby	1301
Richard De Dunham	1340
Hugh De Oundle	1346
William Bolle	1349
Robert De Linton	1350
John De Thursby	1382
Simon De Langton	1383
William Parkyn	1396
Roger De Oversby	1402
William Dunston	1422
Robert Corby	1432
Rochard Bloston	1433
William Barton	1444
Robert Falys	1449
Thomas Carleton	1454
Richard Warmoth	1472
Thomas Jens	1499
John Forster	1504
Roger Saulle	1516
David Smyth	1526
Hugh Treton	1539
Hugh Bytton	1551
William Stafford	1554
Richard Snawdon	1602
George Moodle	1604
Simon Read	1606
Henry Cooke	1627
Matthew Greaves	1651
Richard Holland	1680
Richard Vaughan	1691
Thomas Harrison	1722
Ralph Bridmore	1737
Micheal Tyson	1743
Richard Arthur Knowles	1753
Samuel Hunt	1786
Henry Atlay	1814
Charles Atlay	1823
William Henry Charleton	1840
Edmund May	1848
Henry Bailey Browning	1862
James Frederick Camm	1890
Alfred Joseph Bull	1914
Sydney Herbert Wenham	1922
George Henry Seeley	1925
William Arthur Rees-Jones	1932
Ernest Saunders	1950
Joseph Ormston	1971
Kim Swithinbank	1990
Martyn Taylor	2003

Martyn Taylor, the current rector, served as curate at the church between 1996 and 2003 before becoming rector.

Source: Commemorative plaque on the church wall
