= John Brownlow (priest) =

John Brownlow (4 July 1805 – 24 May 1882) was an Anglican priest in Ireland during the 19th century.

Brownlow was born in Dublin and educated at Trinity College, Dublin. He was for many years the incumbent at Ardbraccan; and Dean of Clonmacnoise from 1862 until his death.
