= Viscount Tyrconnel =

Title in the Peerage of Ireland

Arms of Brownlow: Or, an escutcheon within an orle of martlets sable

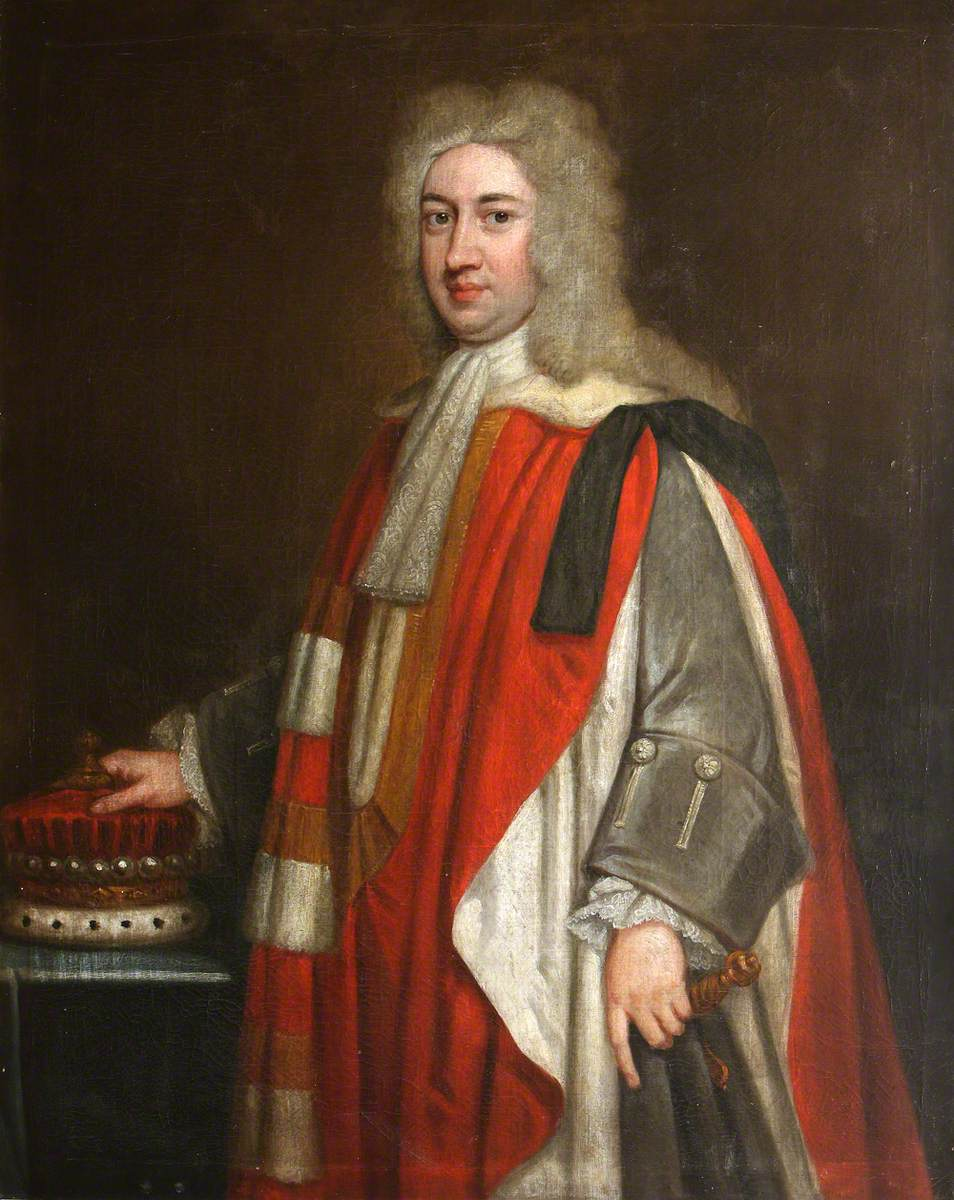
John Brownlow, 1st Viscount Tyrconnel

Viscount Tyrconnel was a title in the Peerage of Ireland. It was created in 1718 for Sir John Brownlow, 5th Baronet, Member of Parliament for Grantham and Lincolnshire. He was made Baron Charleville, in the County of Cork, at the same time, also in the Peerage of Ireland. The Brownlow Baronetcy, of Humby in the County of Lincolnshire, was created in the Baronetage of England on 27 July 1641 for William Brownlow. His grandson, the third Baronet, represented Grantham in Parliament. The latter had no surviving male issue and was succeeded by his younger brother, the fourth Baronet. He sat as Member of Parliament for Peterborough and Bishop's Castle. He was succeeded by his son, the aforementioned fifth Baronet, who was elevated to the Peerage of Ireland as Viscount Tyrconnel. The three titles became extinct on Lord Tyrconnel's death in 1754. The Brownlow estates were passed on to the late Viscount's nephew, Sir John Cust, 3rd Baronet, whose son was created Baron Brownlow in 1776.

Another member of the Brownlow family was Sir John Brownlow, 1st Baronet, of Belton. He was the elder brother of Sir William Brownlow, 1st Baronet, of Humby. On Sir John Brownlow's death in 1679 the Belton estate was passed on to his great-nephew Sir John Brownlow, 3rd Baronet, of Humby.

== Brownlow baronets, of Humby (1641) ==
- Sir William Brownlow, 1st Baronet (c. 1595–1666)
- Sir Richard Brownlow, 2nd Baronet (died 1668) (son)
- Sir John Brownlow, 3rd Baronet (1659–1697) (son)
- Sir William Brownlow, 4th Baronet (1665–1701) (brother)
- Sir John Brownlow, 5th Baronet (1690–1754) (son) (created Viscount Tyrconnel in 1718)

== Viscounts Tyrconnel (1718) ==
- John Brownlow, 1st Viscount Tyrconnel (1690–1754)

== See also ==
- Brownlow baronets, of Belton
- Baron Brownlow
- Belton House
