= Sir William Brownlow, 4th Baronet =

English politician

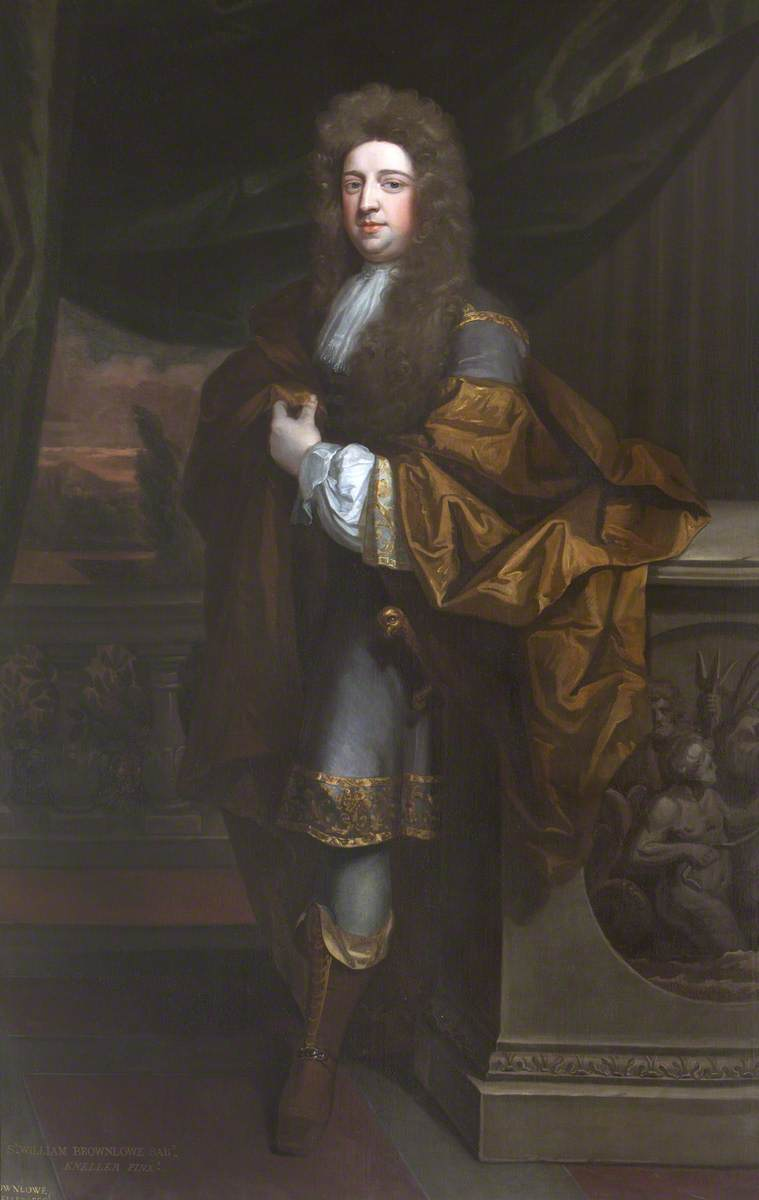
A portrait of Brownlow by Godfrey Kneller

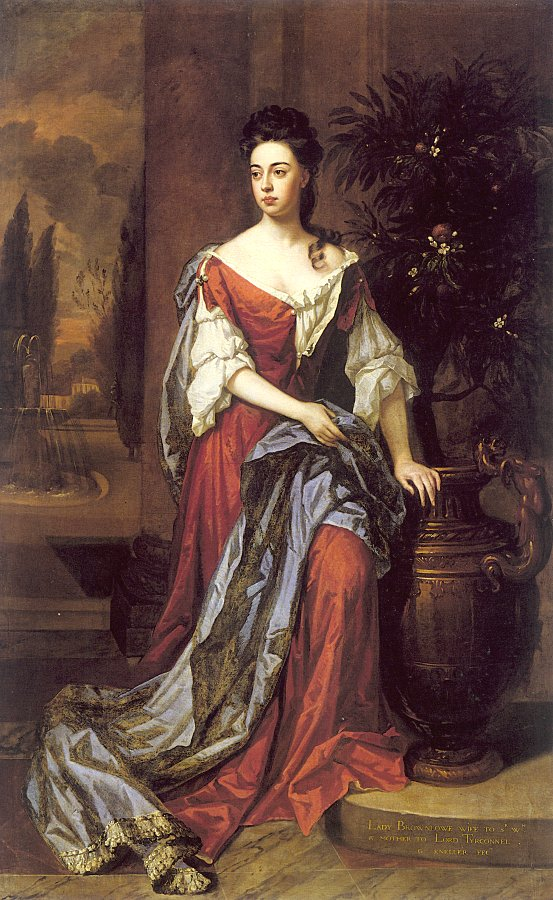
Dorothy Mason (d. 1700), first wife of Sir William Brownlow, 4th Baronet. Portrait by Godfrey Kneller

Sir William Brownlow, 4th Baronet (5 November 1665 – 6 March 1701) was an English politician.

== Origins ==
He was the younger son of Sir Richard Brownlow, 2nd Baronet (died 1668) of Humby in Lincolnshire, by his wife Elizabeth Freke, a daughter of John Freke of Stretton in Dorset.

== Career ==
He was educated at Sidney Sussex College, Cambridge. In 1689 he was elected as a Member of Parliament for Peterborough in Lincolnshire, a seat he held until 1698, and then represented Bishop's Castle from 1698 to 1700. In 1697 he succeeded his elder brother Sir John Brownlow, 3rd Baronet (1659–1697), builder of the surviving Belton House, who committed suicide, as the 4th Baronet, and inherited his estates including Belton, which the 3rd Baronet had inherited from their childless great uncle Sir John Brownlow, 1st Baronet (c. 1594–1679) of Belton.

== Marriages and children ==
He married twice:

- Firstly to Dorothy Mason (d.1700), eldest daughter and co-heiress of Sir Richard Mason (c.1633-1685), MP, and a granddaughter of Sir James Long, 2nd Baronet. By Dorothy he had one son and heir:
  - John Brownlow, 1st Viscount Tyrconnel, 5th Baronet (1690–1754), who in 1718 was raised to the Peerage of Ireland as Viscount Tyrconnel, but died childless.
- Secondly, a few months after the death of his first wife, he married Henrietta Brett, the sister of Col. Henry Brett, who had married Anna Mason (Dorothy's sister), the notorious Countess of Macclesfield, the divorced former wife of Charles Gerard, 2nd Earl of Macclesfield.

== Death and burial ==
He died in March 1701, aged only 35, and was succeeded by his son from his first marriage John Brownlow, 5th Baronet, who in 1718 was raised to the Peerage of Ireland as Viscount Tyrconnel.

Baronetage of England
Preceded by John Brownlow	Baronet (of Humby); 1697–1701	Succeeded by John Brownlow
