= Sir Richard Cust, 2nd Baronet =

English landowner and baronet

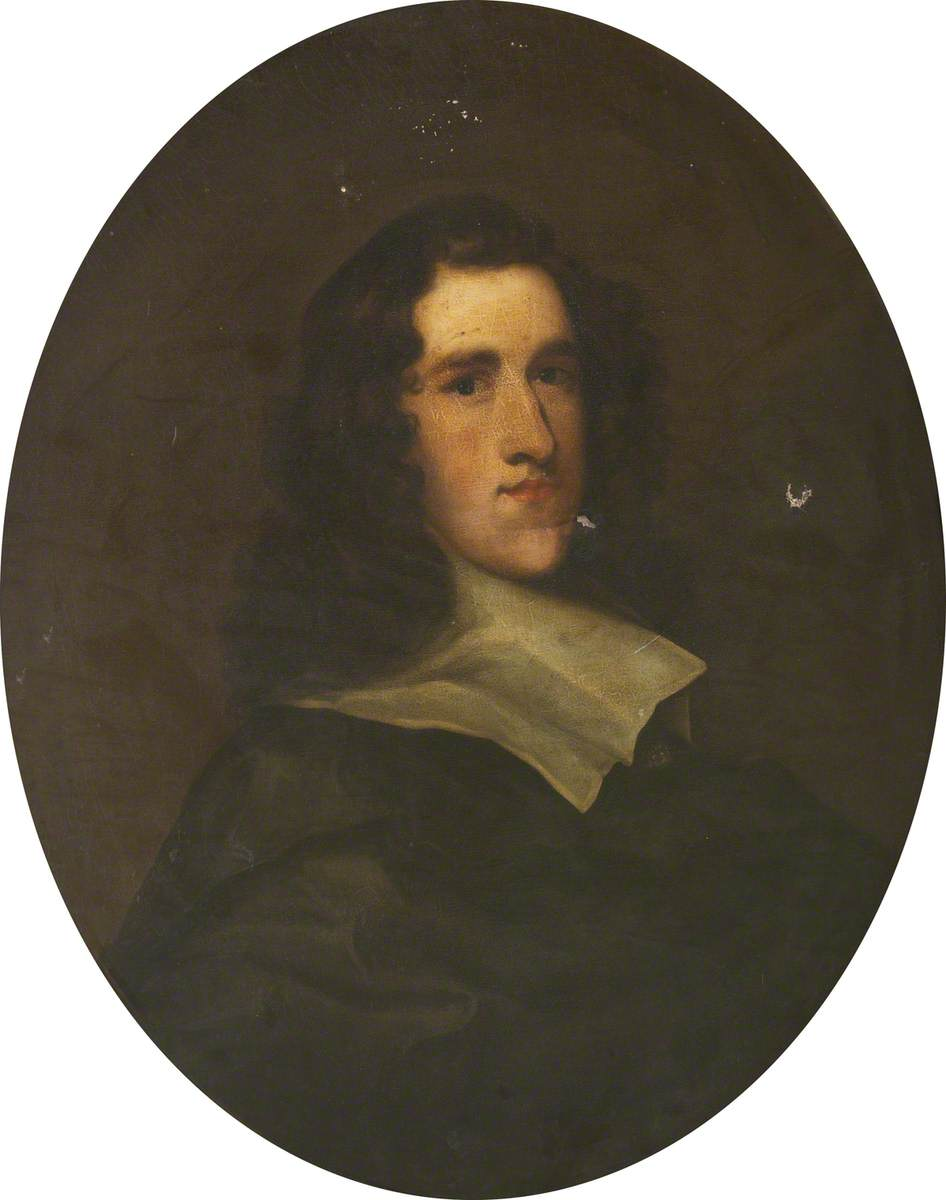
A portrait of Sir Richard Cust, Bt in the collection at Belton House

Sir Richard Cust, 2nd Baronet (October 1680 – 25 July 1734) was an English landowner and baronet.

== Biography ==
Cust was the son of Sir Pury Cust (1655–1698/9) and Ursula Woodcock. He was educated at Eton College and the University of Cambridge, before studying law in London. In August 1700, he succeeded to the title and estates of his paternal grandfather, Sir Richard Cust, 1st Baronet. Initially encumbered by debts from his inheritance, by 1715 Cust had transformed his family's financial situation. This enabled, in 1717, Cust's marriage to Anne Brownlow, sister and heiress of John Brownlow, 1st Viscount Tyrconnel. Through this marriage, Belton House entered the possession of the Cust family. Cust served a term as High Sheriff of Lincolnshire in 1721 and was also a justice of the peace for the county.

Through his marriage to Anne Brownlow, Cust had at least eleven children, including John Cust, Peregrine Cust and Richard Cust. Cust died in 1734 and was buried in St George's Church, Stamford, where he has an elaborate memorial. He was succeeded in his title by his eldest son, John.

Honorary titles
Preceded by John Maddison	High Sheriff of Lincolnshire; 1721	Succeeded by John Becke
Baronetage of England
Preceded by Richard Cust	Baronet (of Stamford); 1700–1734	Succeeded by John Cust
