= Great Humby =

Hamlet in Lincolnshire, England

Coordinates: 52.8961°N 0.5268°W

- Location within Lincolnshire
- OS grid reference: SK992342
- Civil parish: Ropsley and Humby
- District: South Kesteven
- Shire county: Lincolnshire
- Region: East Midlands
- Country: England
- Sovereign state: United Kingdom
- Post town: GRANTHAM
- Postcode district: NG33
- Dialling code: 01476
- Police: Lincolnshire
- Fire: Lincolnshire
- Ambulance: East Midlands
- UK Parliament: Grantham and Bourne

Great Humby is a hamlet in the South Kesteven district of Lincolnshire, England. It lies in the civil parish of Ropsley and Humby, 6 miles (9.7 km) east from Grantham, 1.5 miles (2.4 km) south-east from Ropsley and 3 miles (4.8 km) south from the A52. Little Humby, a larger hamlet, is 720 yards (658.4 m) to the north. It is in the civil parish of Ropsley and Humby.

== History ==
In the Domesday Book of 1086, Humby was written as "Humbi". It had 1 villager, 1 smallholder and 15 freemen. In 1086 it was in the manor of Old Somerby, the lord of the manor being Rainald, and the Tenant-in-Chief, Walter of Aincourt. Before 1232 the manor had been in possession of Thomas de Somerby, after which it passed to William de Paris.

The lawyer Richard Brownlow (1553–1638) purchased the manor of Belton, near Humby, with other estates, and Humby passed to his younger son Sir William Brownlow, 1st Baronet (1595–1666), created a baronet "of Humby" in 1641, whose grandson Sir John Brownlow, 3rd Baronet (1659–1697) appears to have deserted it on having inherited Belton form his great uncle, where he built the surviving grand mansion of Belton House which survives today. Earthworks of the manor's deserted medieval village and hall, with moats and fish ponds, are evident today.

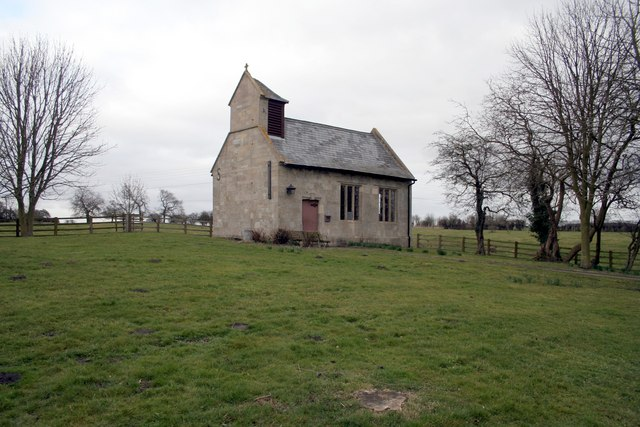
Chapel of St Anne, Great Humby

The 1885 Kelly's Directory recorded that Great Humby was a chapelry, the chapel consisting of a nave only. Previous to that date it was a private chapel of the Brownlow family, the former possessors of the nearby hall; foundations of that hall still existed in 1885. The chapel was restored in 1874 at the expense of J. Murgatroyd, the chief landowner. English Heritage gives the date of St Anne's chapel restoration, to an ashlar building with bellcote, as 1876, following a rebuild in 1682 during the life of Sir William Brownlow. An even earlier chapel at Great Humby was extant in 1470. Next to the chapel stood Great Humby Hall. Built in the 13th century it became a larger hall by the 17th, the probable date it was pulled down.

== Community ==
The Chapel of St Anne is in the ecclesiastical parish of The North Beltisloe Group of parishes, of the Deanery of Beltisloe in the Diocese of Lincoln. From 2006 to 2011 the incumbent was The Revd Richard Ireson.

The village has a population of about 15 people, and a turkey farm. Great Humby is surrounded by farmland, most of the village itself being a farm.
