= Sir William Brownlow, 1st Baronet =

English politician and barrister (c. 1595–1666)

Arms of Brownlow: Or, an escutcheon within an orle of martlets sable

Sir William Brownlow, 1st Baronet (c. 1595–1666) of Humby in Lincolnshire, was an English politician and barrister.

== Origins ==
He was the second son of Richard Brownlow (1553–1638) of Belton in Lincolnshire, which manor he purchased, Chief Prothonotary of the Court of Common Pleas, by his wife Katharine Page, a daughter of John Page of Wembley in Middlesex. His elder brother was Sir John Brownlow, 1st Baronet (c.1594-1679) of Belton, who was created a baronet "of Belton" one day before himself.

== Career ==
He was educated at St Mary Hall, Oxford, where he graduated with a Bachelor of Arts in 1610 or 1611. In 1617 Brownlow was called to the bar by the Inner Temple. Despite having been created by King Charles I a baronet, "of Humby, in the County of Lincoln", on 27 June 1641, one day after the baronetcy of his elder brother, he became a Parliamentarian during the Civil War. From 1653 he sat in the Long Parliament for Lincolnshire.

== Marriage and children ==
In about 1624 he married Elizabeth Duncombe, daughter of William Duncombe, and had by her a daughter and a son:

- Sir Richard Brownlow, 2nd Baronet (d.1668) of Humby, who succeeded to the baronetcy.

Baronetage of England
New creation	Baronet (of Humby); 1641–1666	Succeeded by Richard Brownlow
