= Sir John Cust, 3rd Baronet =

British politician (1718–1770)

The Right Honourable Sir John Cust Bt PC
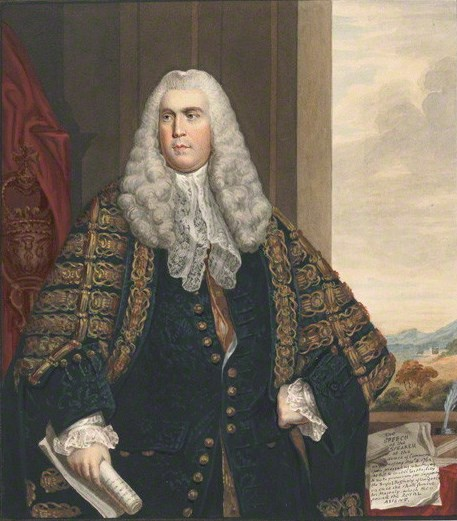
- Sir John Cust, 3rd Baronet, dressed as Speaker of the House of Commons

Speaker of the House of Commons of Great Britain
- In office 3 November 1761 – 19 January 1770
- Monarch: George III
- Prime Minister: Thomas Pelham-Holles; John Stuart; George Grenville; Charles Watson-Wentworth; William Pitt; Augustus FitzRoy
- Preceded by: Arthur Onslow
- Succeeded by: Sir Fletcher Norton

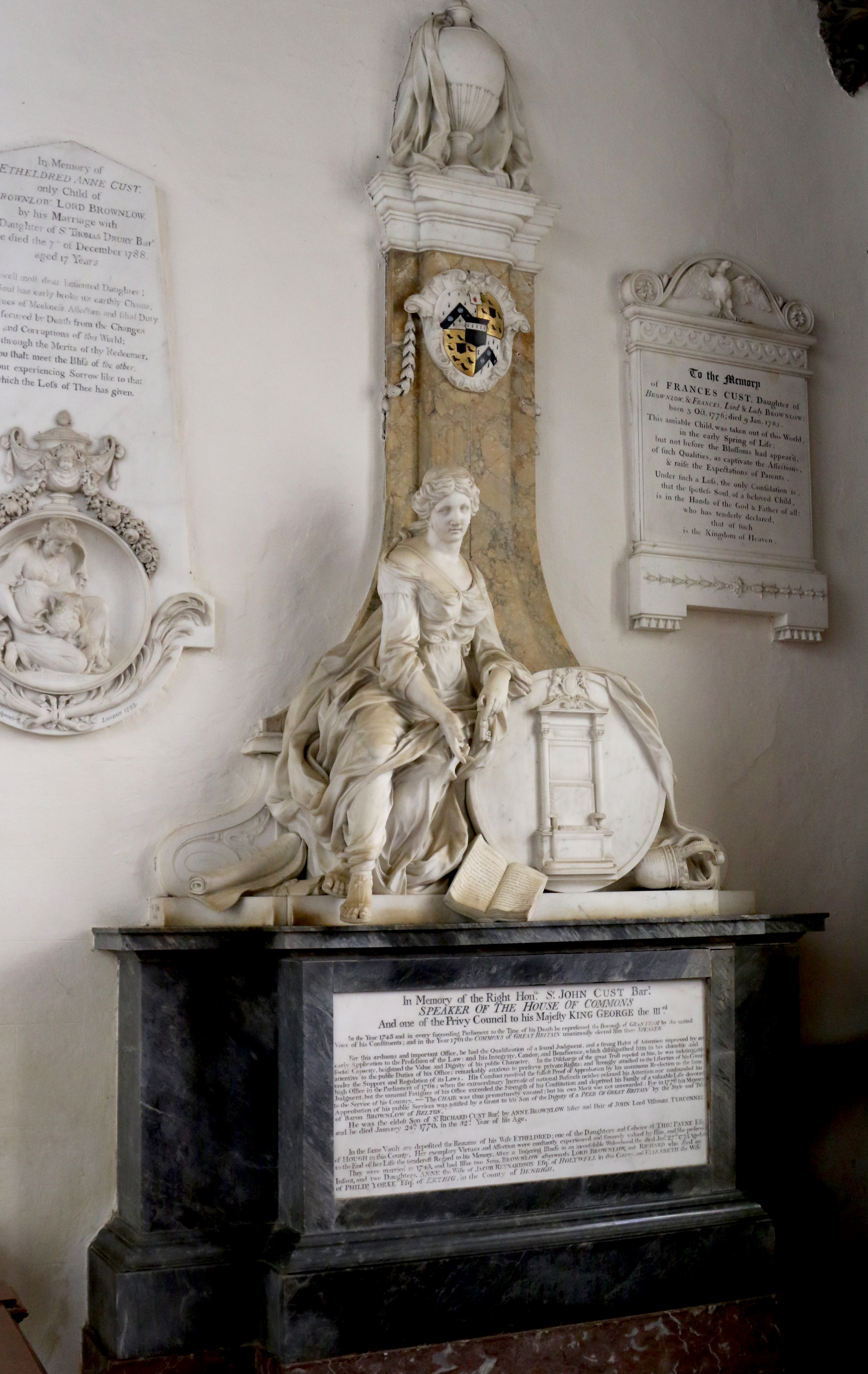
Monument in Belton Church to Sir John Cust, 3rd Baronet. Arms: Cust quartering Brownlow with inescutcheon of pretence of Payne, for his heiress wife

Sir John Cust, 3rd Baronet PC (29 August 1718 – 24 January 1770), of Belton House near Grantham in Lincolnshire, was a British politician who served as Speaker of the House of Commons from 1761 to 1770.

== Origins ==
He was the eldest son of Sir Richard Cust, 2nd Baronet (1680–1734) by his wife Anne Brownlow, daughter of Sir William Brownlow, 4th Baronet, of Belton House, and heiress in her issue of her brother John Brownlow, 1st Viscount Tyrconnel, 5th Baronet (1690–1754), of Belton House.

He was educated at Eton College and Corpus Christi College, Cambridge and studied law at the Middle Temple, where he was called to the bar in 1742.

== Career ==
Cust was elected as a Member of Parliament for Grantham in 1743, which seat he continued to represent until his death 27 years later. In 1754 his mother inherited Belton House from her childless brother, John Brownlow, 1st Viscount Tyrconnel, the last male of the Brownlow family. He was unanimously elected Speaker of the House of Commons in 1761, and unanimously reelected in 1768. He was admitted to the Privy Council in 1762.

On 17 January 1770, Cust sent word to the House of Commons that he was too ill to attend. He resigned on 19 January; his successor Sir Fletcher Norton was elected on 22 January. Cust died on 24 January 1770, aged 51. His memorial in Belton church was created by William Tyler RA.

== Marriage and progeny ==
In 1743 he married Etheldreda Payne, a daughter of Thomas Payne, by whom he had two sons and two daughters, including:

- Brownlow Cust, 1st Baron Brownlow, 4th Baronet (1744–1807), who succeeded his father in the baronetcy and in 1776 was raised to the peerage as Baron Brownlow in recognition of his father's services.
- Elizabeth Cust (1750–1779), married Philip Yorke I (1743–1804) of Erddig House, as his first wife.

== Sources ==
- Barker, G. F. R. (1888). "Cust, John" . In Stephen, Leslie (ed.). Dictionary of National Biography. Vol. 13. London: Smith, Elder & Co.
- Cobbett, Richard. The Parliamentary History of England.

Parliament of Great Britain
Preceded by Sir Michael Newton, Bt; Marquess of Granby	Member of Parliament for Grantham; 1743–1770; With: Marquess of Granby; Lord George Manners	Succeeded by Francis Cust; Lord George Manners
Political offices
Preceded by Arthur Onslow	Speaker of the House of Commons of Great Britain; 1761–1770	Succeeded by Sir Fletcher Norton
Baronetage of England
Preceded by Richard Cust	Baronet (of Stamford); 1734–1770	Succeeded by Brownlow Cust
