= Sir John Brownlow, 3rd Baronet =

English member of parliament (1659–1697)

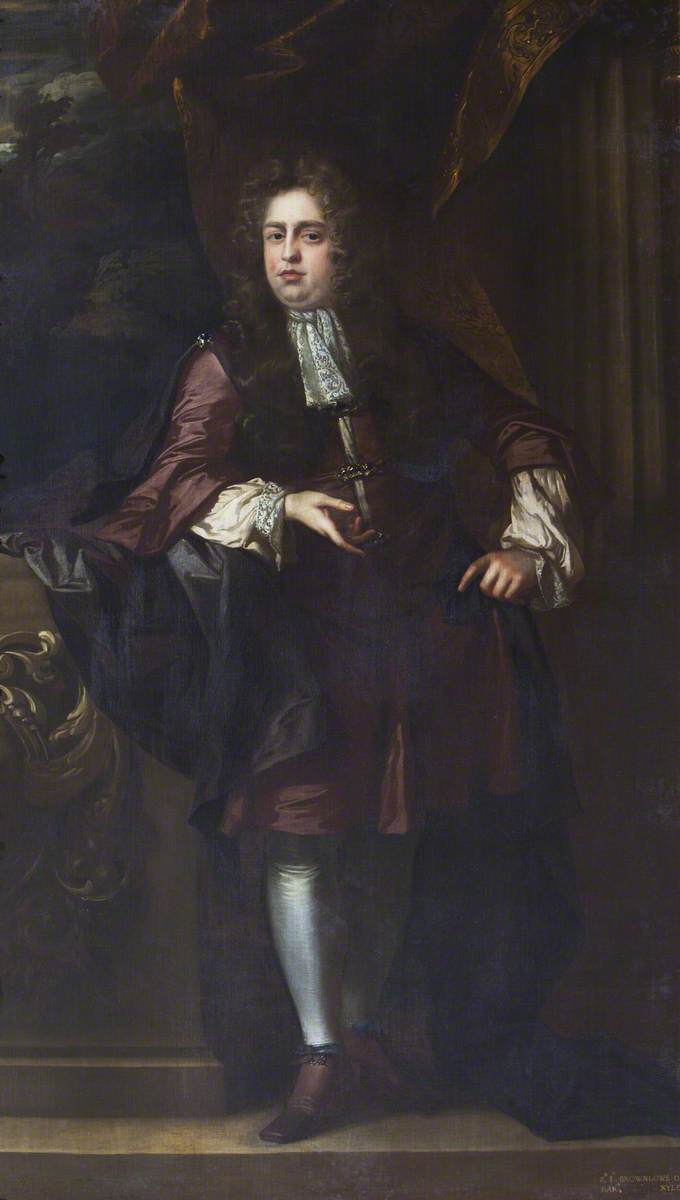
Portrait of Brownlow

Arms of Brownlow: Or, an escutcheon within an orle of martlets sable

Sir John Brownlow, 3rd Baronet (26 June 1659 – 16 July 1697) of Belton House near Grantham in Lincolnshire, was an English member of parliament. He built the grand mansion of Belton House, which survives today.

== Life ==
He was born on 26 June 1659, the eldest surviving son and heir of Sir Richard Brownlow, 2nd Baronet of Humby, Lincolnshire, by his wife Elizabeth Freke, a daughter of John Freke of Stretton in Dorset.

He was educated at Westminster School. In 1668 he succeeded his father as the 3rd baronet, of Humby, and in 1679 he inherited the estate of Belton, with others, from his childless great-uncle Sir John Brownlow, 1st Baronet. He built the present Belton House between 1685 and 1687, creating new gardens and lakes.

In 1686 he was Treasurer of the Marshalsea and in 1688 was appointed Sheriff of Lincolnshire. In 1689 he was elected as a member of parliament for Grantham, a seat he held until his early death in 1697.

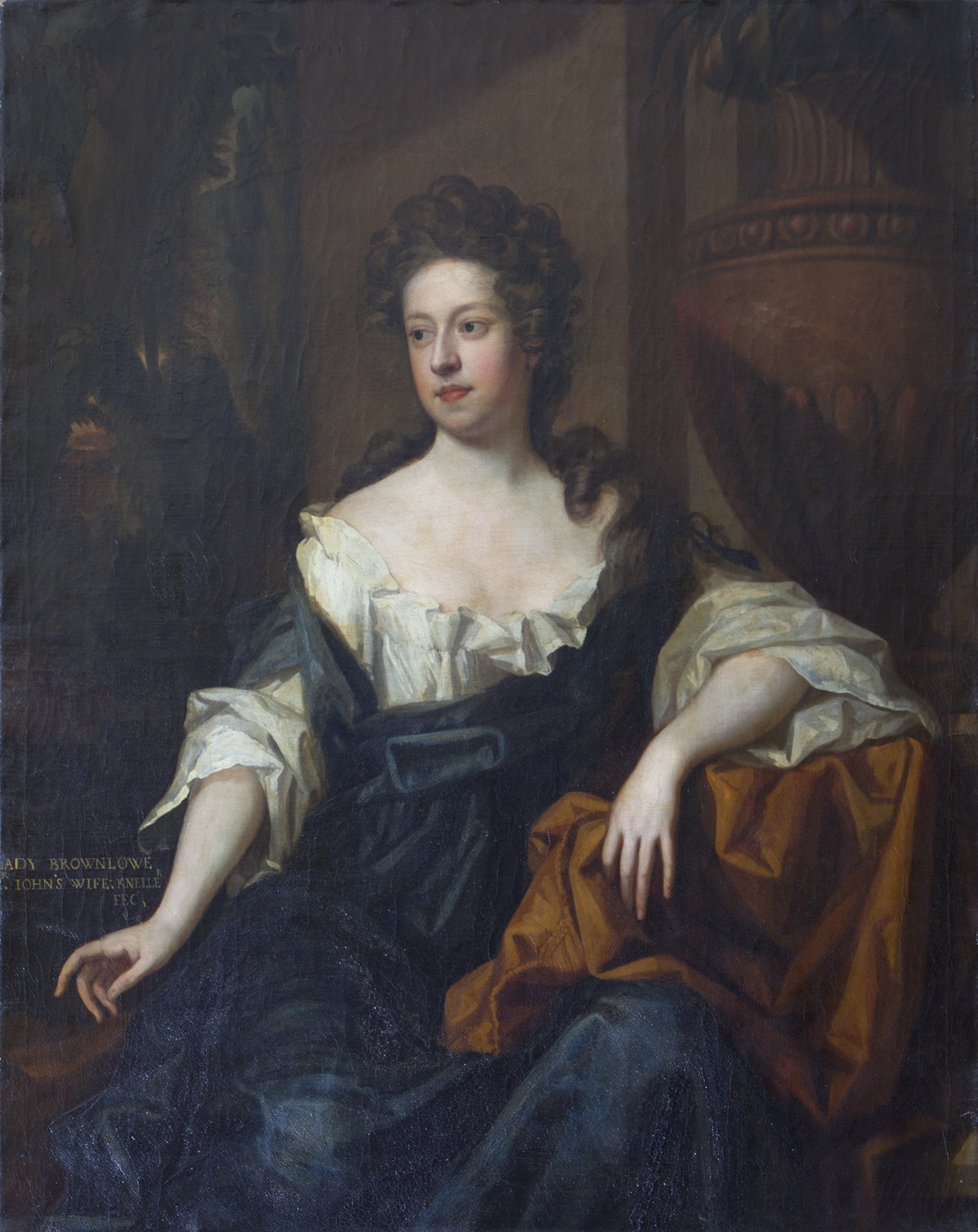
Portrait of Alice Sherard, Lady Brownlow

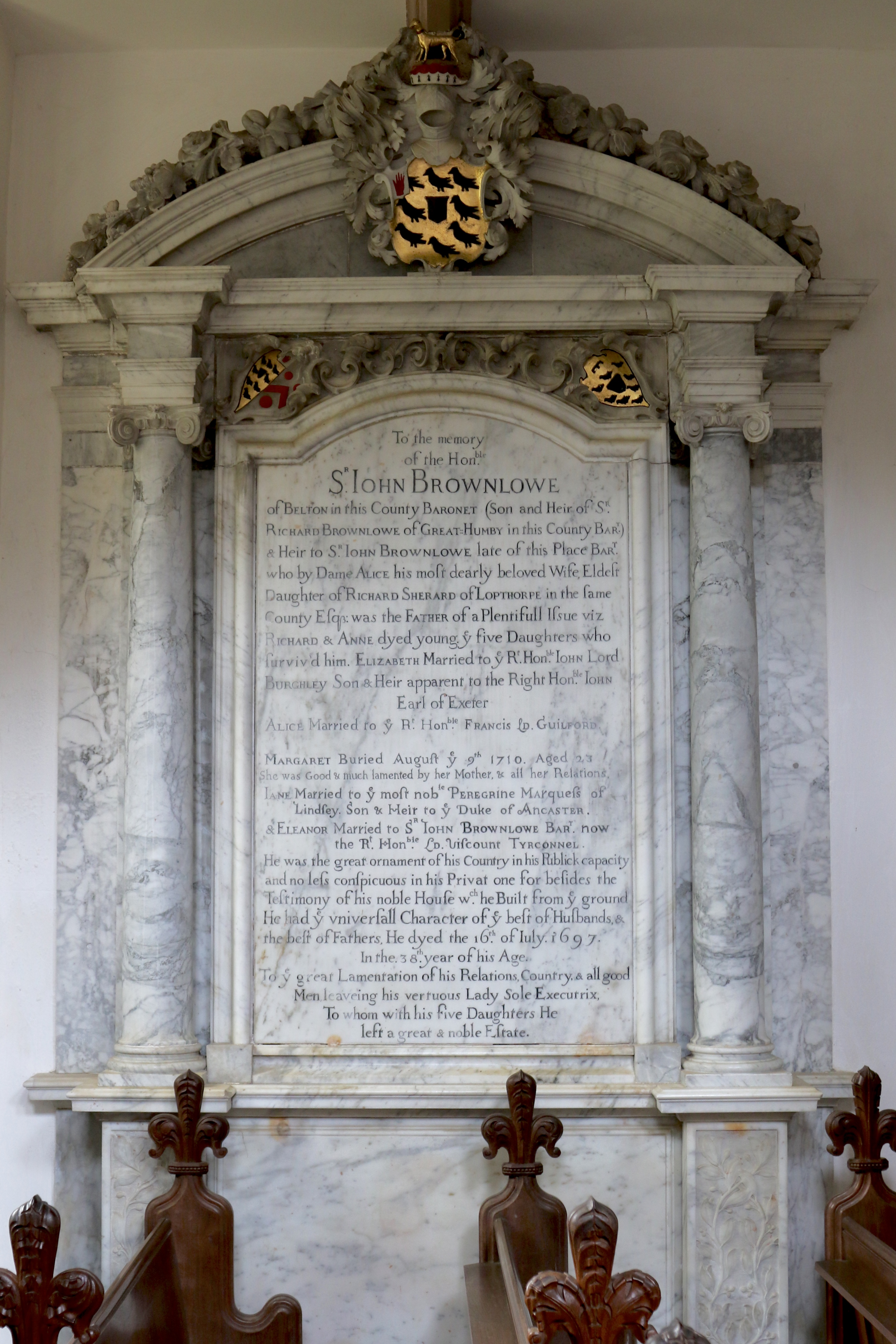
Monument to Sir John Brownlow, Belton Church

In 1676 he married Alice Sherard (died 1721), a daughter of Richard Sherard of Lopethorp in Lincolnshire, by whom he had four (or five) daughters but no sons:

- Jane Brownlow (died 1736), who married Peregrine Bertie, 2nd Duke of Ancaster and Kesteven in 1711;
- Elizabeth Brownlow (1681–1723), who married John Cecil, 6th Earl of Exeter in 1699;
- Alicia Brownlow (1684–1727), who married Francis North, 2nd Baron Guilford in 1703;
- Margaret Brownlow (1687–1710)
- Eleanor Brownlow (1691–1730), who in 1712 married her first cousin, John Brownlow, 1st Viscount Tyrconnel, 5th Baronet of Belton, the last living male of the Brownlow family, the son of her father's younger brother Sir William Brownlow, 4th Baronet. The marriage was childless, whereupon the titles became extinct and the Brownlow estates passed to the Viscount's nephew Sir John Cust, 3rd Baronet.

Sir John Brownlow committed suicide, aged only 38, in July 1697 after suffering from severe gout. As he died with no surviving sons, he was succeeded in his title and in most of his estates, including Belton, by his younger brother Sir William Brownlow, 4th Baronet, who received Belton House on condition that John's widow Alice Sherard should retain possession of it during her lifetime. As she outlived Sir William, it therefore passed on her death in 1721 to William's son John Brownlow, 1st Viscount Tyrconnel.

== Sources ==
- Leigh Rayment's list of baronets
- Leigh Rayment's Historical List of MPs

Parliament of England
Preceded by Thomas Harrington; John Thorold	Member of Parliament for Grantham; 1689–1697; With: Sir Willam Ellys, Bt	Succeeded by Sir William Ellys, Bt; Sir John Thorold, Bt
Baronetage of England
Preceded by Richard Brownlow	Baronet (of Humby); 1668–1697	Succeeded by William Brownlow
