= Baron Brownlow =

Title in the Peerage of Great Britain

Arms of Cust, Baron Brownlow: Ermine, on a chevron sable three fountains proper

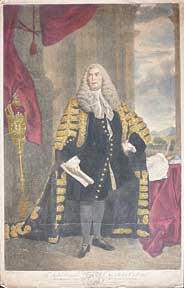
Sir John Cust, 3rd Baronet (1718–1770), Speaker of the House of Commons and father of the 1st Baron Brownlow

Baron Brownlow, of Belton in the County of Lincoln, is a title in the Peerage of Great Britain. It was created in 1776 for Sir Brownlow Cust, 4th Baronet. The Cust family descends from Richard Cust (1622–1700) of The Black Friars, Stamford, who represented Lincolnshire and Stamford in Parliament. In 1677 he was created a baronet, "of Stamford in the County of Lincoln". He was succeeded by his grandson Sir Richard Cust, 2nd Baronet, who married Anne Brownlow, daughter of Sir William Brownlow, 4th Baronet, "of Humby", Lincolnshire, and sister and sole heiress of John Brownlow, 1st Viscount Tyrconnel, 5th Baronet of Belton House, Lincolnshire. The 2nd Baronet's son Sir John Cust, 3rd Baronet, sat as a member of parliament for Grantham and served as Speaker of the House of Commons from 1761 to 1770 and in 1754 inherited the Brownlow estates, including Belton, on the death of his childless maternal uncle Viscount Tyrconnel. His son Brownlow Cust, 4th Baronet, represented Ilchester, Somerset, and Grantham in Parliament and in 1776 was raised to the peerage as Baron Brownlow, "of Belton in the County of Lincoln", chiefly in recognition of his father's services. He was succeeded by his son John Cust, 2nd Baron Brownlow, who had sat as a member of parliament for Clitheroe, Lancashire, and also served as Lord Lieutenant of Lincolnshire for many years. In 1815 he was created Viscount Alford, "in the County of Lincoln", and Earl Brownlow, both in the Peerage of the United Kingdom. In 1810 the future 1st Earl had married Sophia Hume, a daughter of Sir Abraham Hume, 2nd Baronet, of Wormleybury, by his wife Lady Amelia Egerton, a great-granddaughter of John Egerton, 3rd Earl of Bridgewater.

On his death in 1853, the titles passed to his grandson John Egerton-Cust, 2nd Earl Brownlow (the son of John Egerton, Viscount Alford), who in 1853, in accordance with the will of his kinsman John Egerton, 7th Earl of Bridgewater, assumed by royal licence the surname and arms of Egerton in lieu of Cust, but in 1863 by royal licence resumed the surname of Cust in addition to that of Egerton. The 2nd Earl, having managed to inherit the substantial Bridgewater estates after a remarkable lawsuit, died young and was succeeded in 1867 by his younger brother Adelbert Brownlow-Cust, 3rd Earl Brownlow, a Conservative politician who briefly represented Shropshire North in the House of Commons before inheriting the peerage. The 3rd Earl later served under Lord Salisbury as Paymaster General (1887–1889) and as Under-Secretary of State for War (1889–1892), and was also Lord Lieutenant of Lincolnshire for over fifty years. However, on his death the viscountcy and earldom became extinct.

He was succeeded in the barony and baronetcy in 1921 by his second cousin Adelbert Salusbury Cockayne-Cust, 5th Baron Brownlow, 8th Baronet, the youngest son of Henry Cockayne-Cust, eldest son of Reverend Henry Cust, younger son of the 1st Baron. His son Peregrine Cust, 6th Baron Brownlow, succeeded in 1927 and served as a Lord-in-waiting to the Prince of Wales (later King Edward VIII), as Parliamentary Private Secretary to Lord Beaverbrook (Minister of Aircraft Production), as Lord Lieutenant of Lincolnshire and as Mayor of Grantham. In 1978 he was succeeded by his son Edward Cust, 7th Baron Brownlow, who died in 2021.

== Cust baronets, of Stamford (1677) ==
- Sir Richard Cust, 1st Baronet (1622–1700)
- Sir Richard Cust, 2nd Baronet (1680–1734)
- Sir John Cust, 3rd Baronet (1718–1770)
- Sir Brownlow Cust, 4th Baronet (1744–1807) (created Baron Brownlow in 1776)

=== Barons Brownlow (1776) ===
- Brownlow Cust, 1st Baron Brownlow (1744–1807)
- John Cust, 2nd Baron Brownlow (1779–1853) (created Earl Brownlow and Viscount Alford in 1815)

=== Earls Brownlow, Viscount Alford (1815) ===
- John Cust, 1st Earl Brownlow (1779–1853)
  - John Hume Egerton, Viscount Alford (1812–1851)
- John Egerton-Cust, 2nd Earl Brownlow (1842–1867)
- Adelbert Wellington Brownlow Home-Cust, 3rd Earl Brownlow (1844–1921)

=== Barons Brownlow (1776; reverted) ===
- Adelbert Salusbury Cockayne-Cust, 5th Baron Brownlow (1867–1927)
- Peregrine Francis Adelbert Cust, 6th Baron Brownlow (1899–1978)
- Edward John Peregrine Cust, 7th Baron Brownlow (1936–2021)
- Peregrine Edward Quintin Cust, 8th Baron Brownlow (b. 1974)

There is no heir to the title.

== Belton House ==
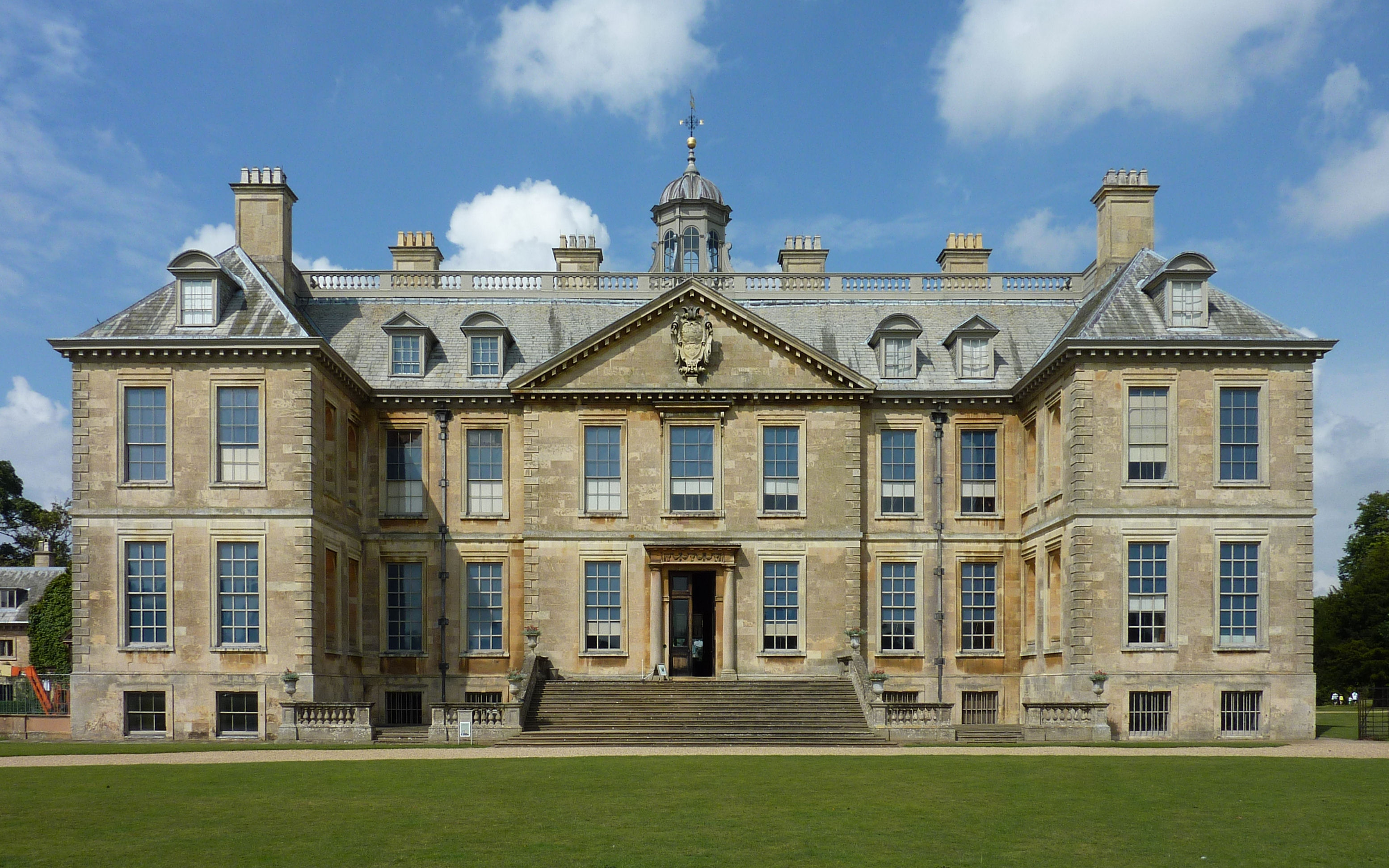
Belton House, 2011 photograph

The family seat was Belton House, in the parish of Belton, near Grantham in Lincolnshire, which in 1984 was given by the 7th Baron to the National Trust.

== Extended family ==
- Peregrine Cust and William Cust, younger sons of the 1st Baron, were both Members of Parliament.
- William Cust's son Arthur Purey-Cust was Dean of York.
- Edward Cust, another younger son of the 1st Baron, was a soldier and politician. He was created a Baronet in 1876 (see Cust baronets of Leasowe Castle (1876)).
- Henry John "Harry" Cockayne-Cust (1861–1917), a brother of the 5th Baron, was a politician and newspaper editor.

== See also ==
- Viscount Tyrconnel
- Earl of Bridgewater
