= John Brownlow, 1st Viscount Tyrconnel =

British politician (1690–1754)

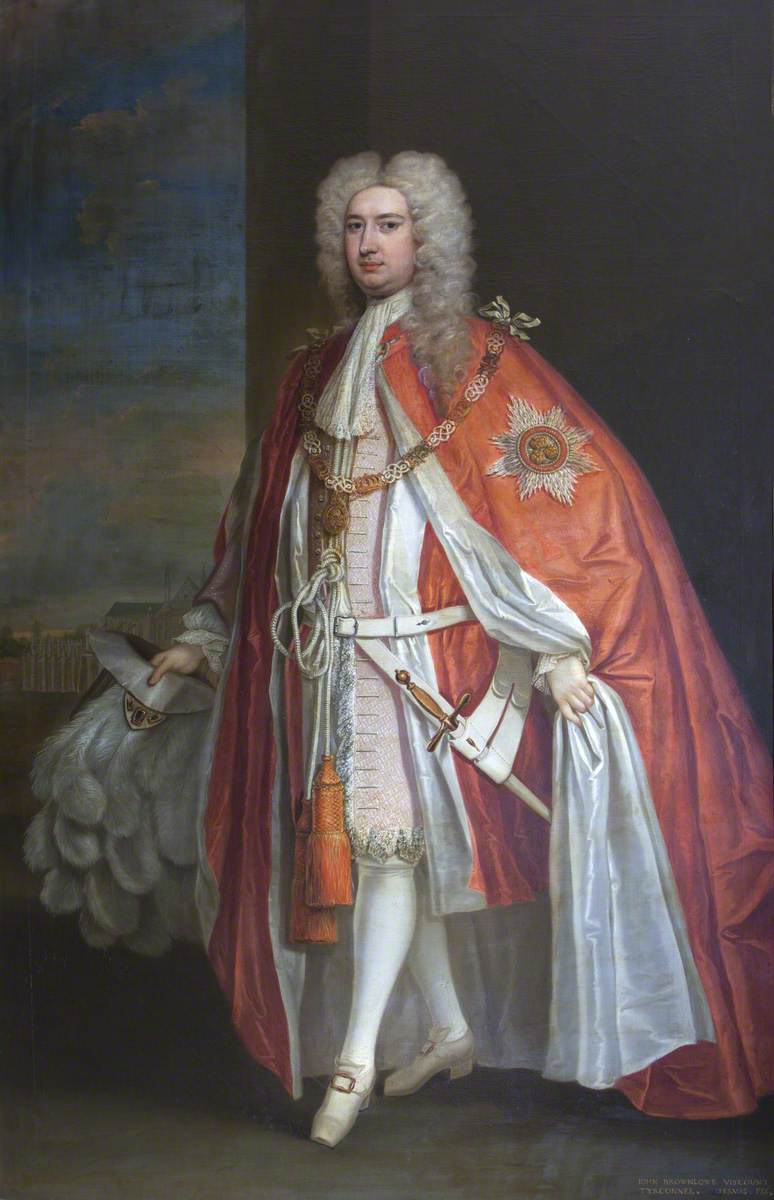
John Brownlow, 1st Viscount Tyrconnel

Arms of Brownlow: Or, an escutcheon within an orle of martlets sable

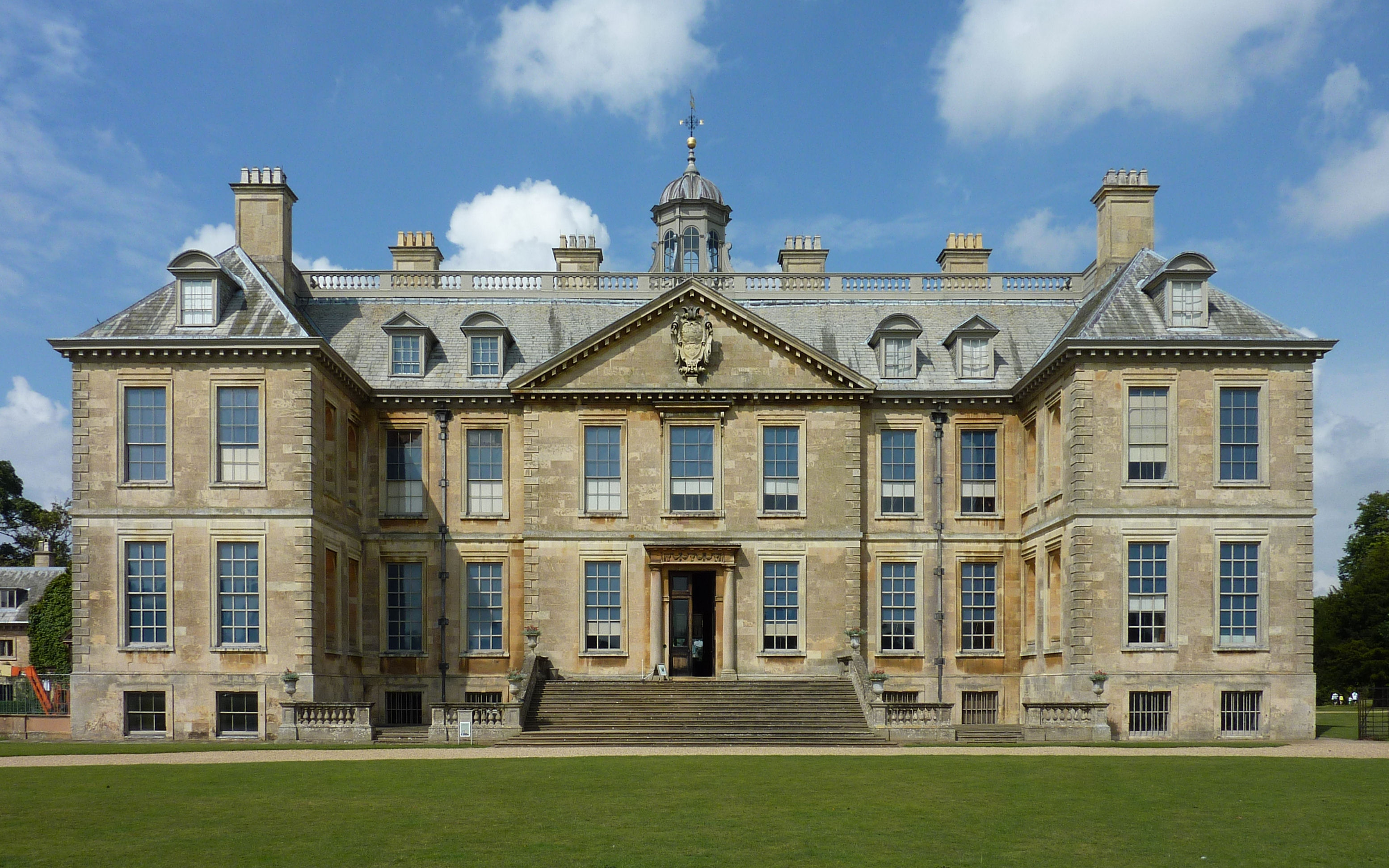
Belton House, Lincolnshire

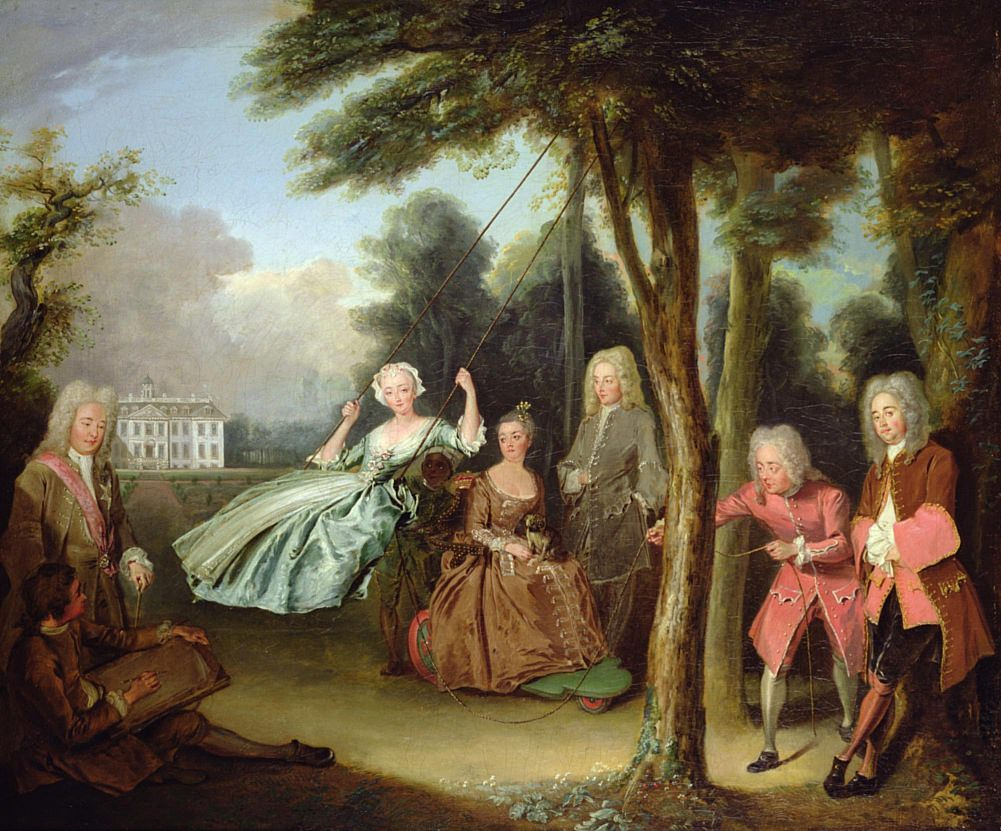
Philippe Mercier: John Brownlow and his family

John Brownlow, 1st Viscount Tyrconnel (16 November 1690 – 27 February 1754), KB, known as Sir John Brownlow, 5th Baronet, from 1701 to 1718, of Belton House near Grantham in Lincolnshire, was a British politician who sat in the House of Commons from 1713 to 1741.

== Origins ==
He was the only son of Sir William Brownlow, 4th Baronet (1665–1701) of Belton by his first wife Dorothy Mason, eldest daughter and co-heiress of Sir Richard Mason (d. 1685), MP, of Sutton in Surrey.

== Career ==
Both his parents died before he was 11 and he was brought up by his maternal grandmother, Lady Mason, who had assumed administration of his father's affairs. When he came of age at 21, he found great fault with the management of his property, and the resulting coolness between himself and his grandmother was exacerbated by his possession of the Mason manor of Sutton in Surrey, which he had inherited from his mother, but which Lady Mason believed belonged rightly to the children of her other daughter, Anne Brett, aka Anne Mason, the notorious Countess of Macclesfield, the divorced former wife of Charles Gerard, 2nd Earl of Macclesfield.

In 1713 Brownlow was elected as a Member of Parliament for Grantham. In 1715 he was returned unopposed as an MP for Lincolnshire instead. In 1718 he was raised to the Peerage of Ireland as Baron Charleville in the County of Cork, and as Viscount Tyrconnel. He was re-elected as MP for Grantham in 1722 and was returned there unopposed in 1727 and 1734. He did not stand in 1741.

In literature, referred to as Lord Tyrconnel, he is known as the sometime patron of the poet, Richard Savage, who claimed to be the illegitimate son of Richard Savage, 4th Earl Rivers and Anne Brett. The motives for his patronage are unclear but, apparently, he accepted the poet's claim as to his parentage and, as referenced above, there was familial friction between Lord Tyrconnel and his grandmother, Lady Mason.

== Marriages ==
He married twice, but produced no progeny:

- Firstly to his first cousin Eleanor Brownlow (d.1730), youngest of the four daughters and co-heiress of his uncle Sir John Brownlow, 3rd Baronet (1659–1697), the builder of Belton House. On her father's death in 1697 she received a share of his estate, but not until the death of her mother Alice Sherard in 1721 did she recover possession of Belton House.
- Secondly in 1732 he married Elizabeth Cartwright, a daughter of William Cartwright (1675–1748) of Marnham, Nottinghamshire, whose mural monument survives in St Wilfrid's Church, Low Marnham.

== Death and succession ==
He died without progeny in February 1754, aged 63, whereupon both the baronetcy and the two peerages became extinct. The Brownlow estates, including Belton House, were inherited by his nephew Sir John Cust, 3rd Baronet (1718–1770) (son of his sister Anne Brownlow), whose son later in 1776 was raised to the peerage as Baron Brownlow.

Parliament of Great Britain
| Preceded by Sir John Thorold; Sir William Ellys | Member of Parliament for Grantham; 1713–1715; With: Sir John Thorold | Succeeded by Edward Rolt; John Heathcote |
| Preceded by Sir Willoughby Hickman; Lord Willoughby de Eresby | Member of Parliament for Lincolnshire; 1715–1722; With: Sir Willoughby Hickman 1715–1720; Sir William Massingberd 1720–1722 | Succeeded by Sir William Massingberd; Henry Heron |
| Preceded by Edward Rolt; Sir John Heathcote | Member of Parliament for Grantham; 1722–1741; With: Francis Fisher 1722–1727; Sir Michael Newton 1722–1741 | Succeeded by Marquess of Granby; Sir Michael Newton |
Peerage of Ireland
| New creation | Viscount Tyrconnel; 1718–1754 | Extinct |
Baronetage of England
| Preceded by William Brownlow | Baronet (of Humby); 1701–1754 | Extinct |
