= Tower Pier =

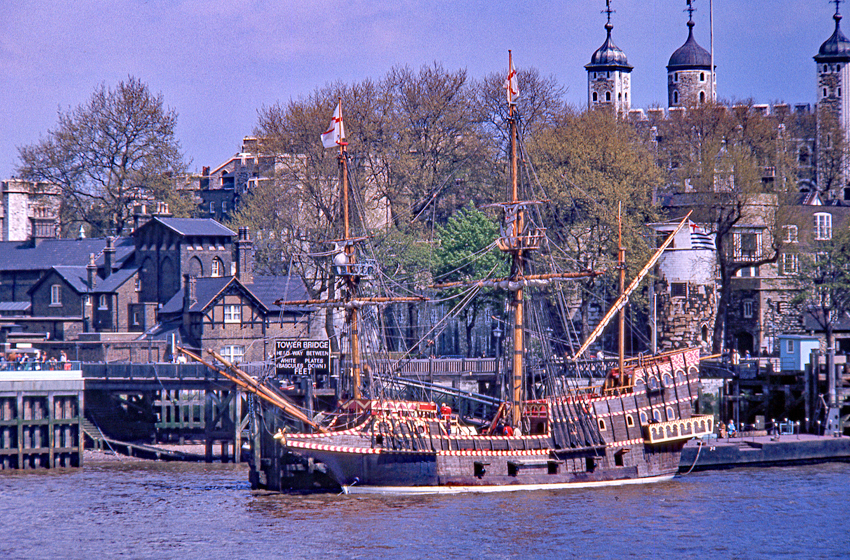
Golden Hinde (1973) at Tower Pier, 1 May 1974

Tower Pier may refer to:

- Tower Millennium Pier, since 14 July 2000, a passenger boat service pier on the river Thames near the Tower of London, UK
- Tower Lifeboat Station, since 2 January 2002, formerly at Tower Millennium Pier, now next to Waterloo Bridge
- Sugar Quay, since 1899, a berth for ships
