= Edward Marshall (sculptor) =

English sculptor (1598 – 1675)

Edward Marshall (1598–1675) was a 17th-century English mason and sculptor. He served as King's Master Mason from 1660 to 1666.

== Life ==
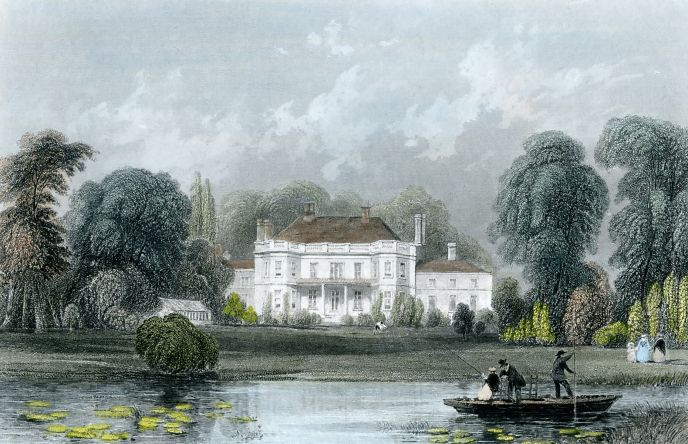
Barn Elms manor house in the Victorian era

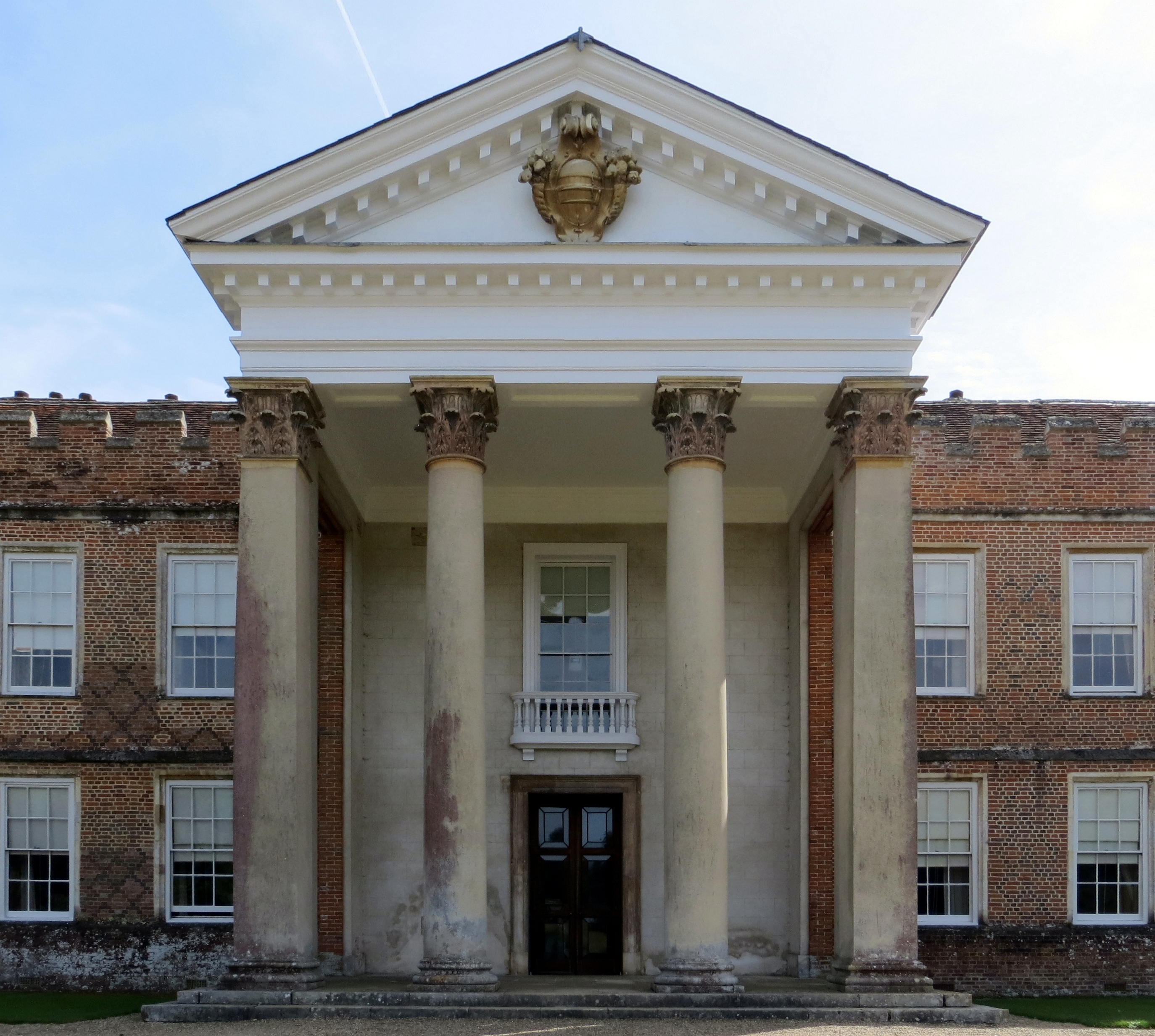
Portico at The Vyne

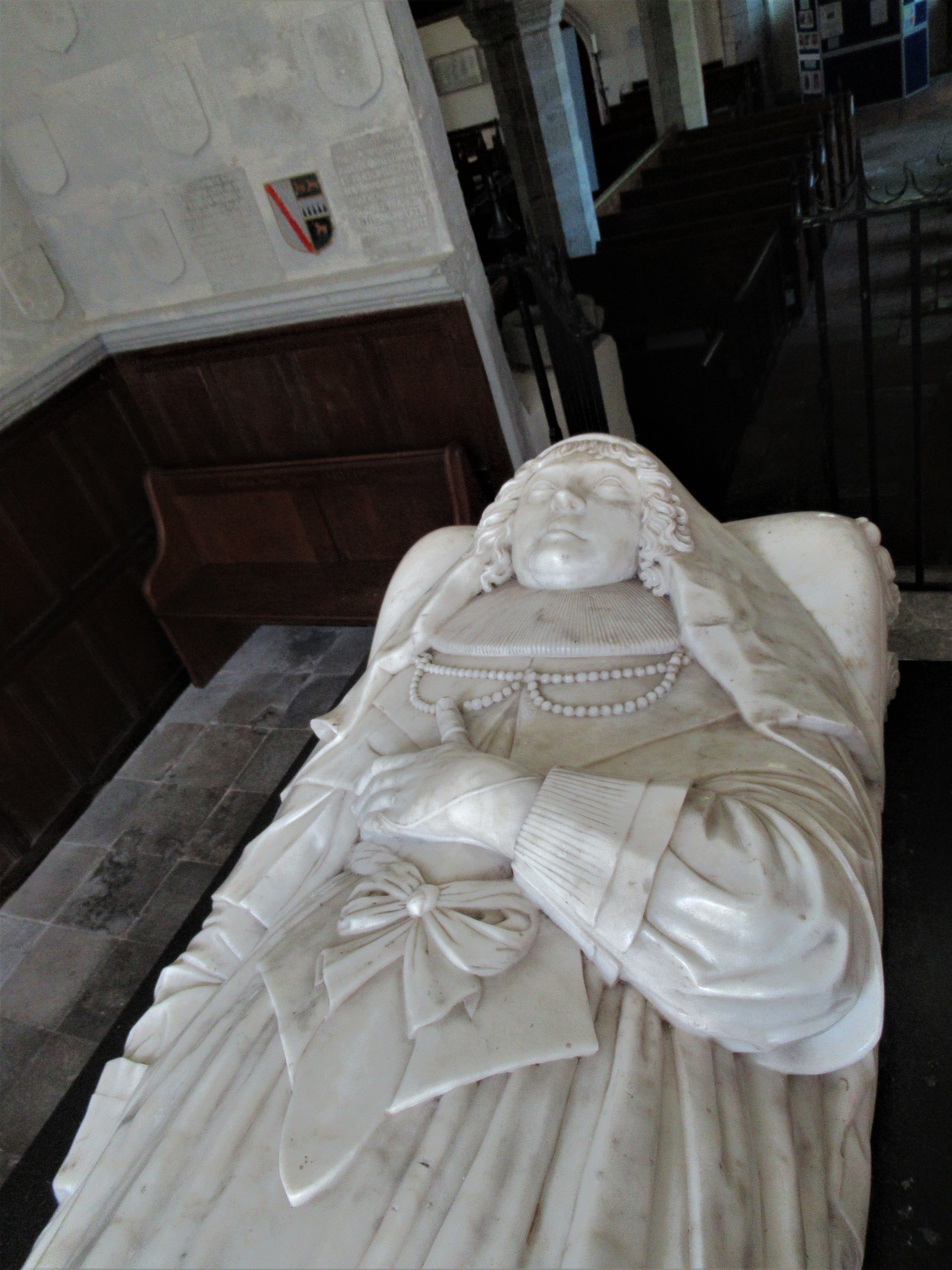
Culpeper tomb, Hollingbourne

He was born in Nottinghamshire in 1598 but moved to London with his family and trained as a mason under Nicholas Stone from around 1612. He became a Freeman of the Worshipful Company of Masons in 1626 and served twice as the Master of the company. He was further appointed Master Mason to King Charles II in 1660 and as such worked on several Royal palaces.

He had premises on Fetter Lane but lived in middle life (until 1659) at Barn Elms on the River Thames in Surrey. In his role as Master Mason to the Crown he worked on the Tower of London and several royal palaces and was paid a shilling a day. He stood down as King's Master Mason around 1666 probably due to age and the role passed to his son. No work is recorded in his name after 1666, the Great Fire of London. This is probably due to a number of factors: his stoneyard in London was within the heart of the fire; and his age (68).

He died in London on 10 December 1675. He was buried at St Dunstan-in-the-West.

== Works ==
- Monument to Richard Braham in Windsor Parish Church (1618)
- Monument to William Cavendish, 2nd Earl of Devonshire at All Saints Church in Derby (1628)
- Monument to the Earl of Totnes at Stratford-upon-Avon (1629)
- Monument to Lady Anne Cutts of Horham Hall at Swavesey (1631)
- Monument to Michael Drayton in Westminster Abbey (1631)
- Monument to William Peck and his wife at Spixworth (1635)
- Monument to Henry Saunders in St Mary Magdalen Church in Canterbury (1637)
- Monument to Henry Curwen in Amersham (1638)
- Monument to Lady Elizabeth Colepeper at Hollingbourne (1638)
- Memorial brass in church floor to Sir Edward Filmer and Lady Filmer at East Sutton (1638)
- Monument to Francis Williamson at Walkeringham (1639)
- Monument to Lady Dorothy Selby at Ightham (1641)
- Monument to Sir Robert Barkham and Lady Barkham in Tottenham Parish Church (1644)
- Rebuilding of Aynhoe Park following damage in the English Civil War (c. 1647 – 1649)
- Monument to the Howe family at St Michael's Church in Withington (1651)
- Monument to Sir Robert Cotton at Connington (1655)
- Main Portico and fireplaces at The Vyne (1656)
- Monument to Bridget Gore (widow of the Lord Mayor of London) at Gilston (1657)
- Monument to Sir Thomas Playters at Sotterley (1658)
- Monument to Lady Frances Playters at Dickleburgh (1659)
- Monument to Mrs Pagett at Windsor Parish Church (1666)

== Family ==
He was married to Anne (d. 1673). He had fourteen children but all predeceased him, except his son, Joshua Marshall, who succeeded him as Master Mason to the King. After Anne's death he remarried, to Margaret White, daughter of John White, and widow of Henry Parker of Barnet, and the elder sister of one of his daughters-in-law.

All are buried at St Dunstan-in-the-West.

=== Gallery ===
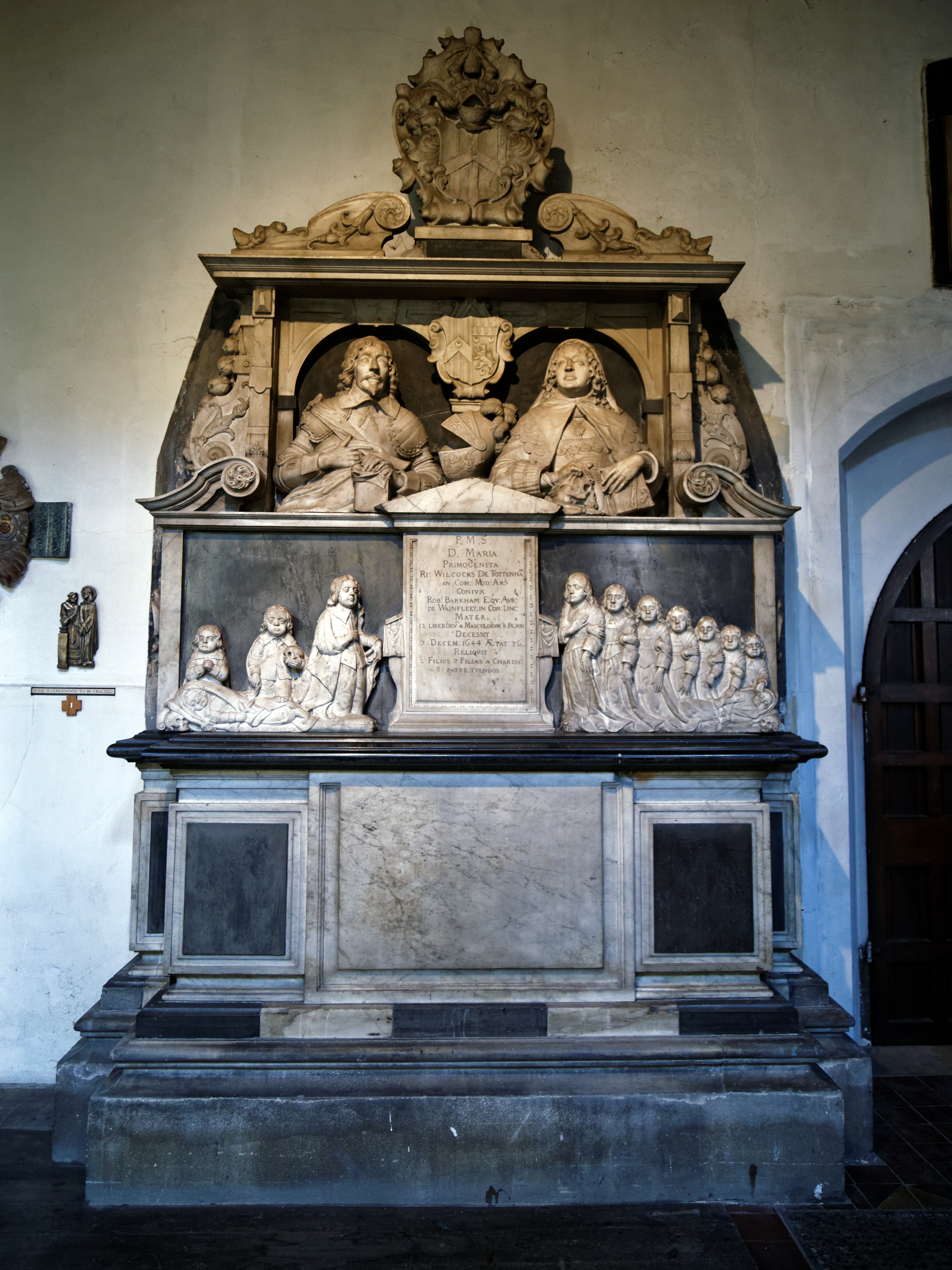
Monument to sir Richard Barkham and Lady Barkham, All Hallows Church, Tottenham

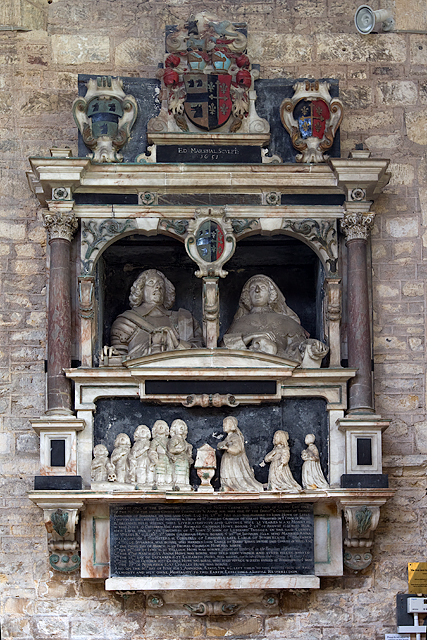
The Howe monument in St Michael's Church, Withington

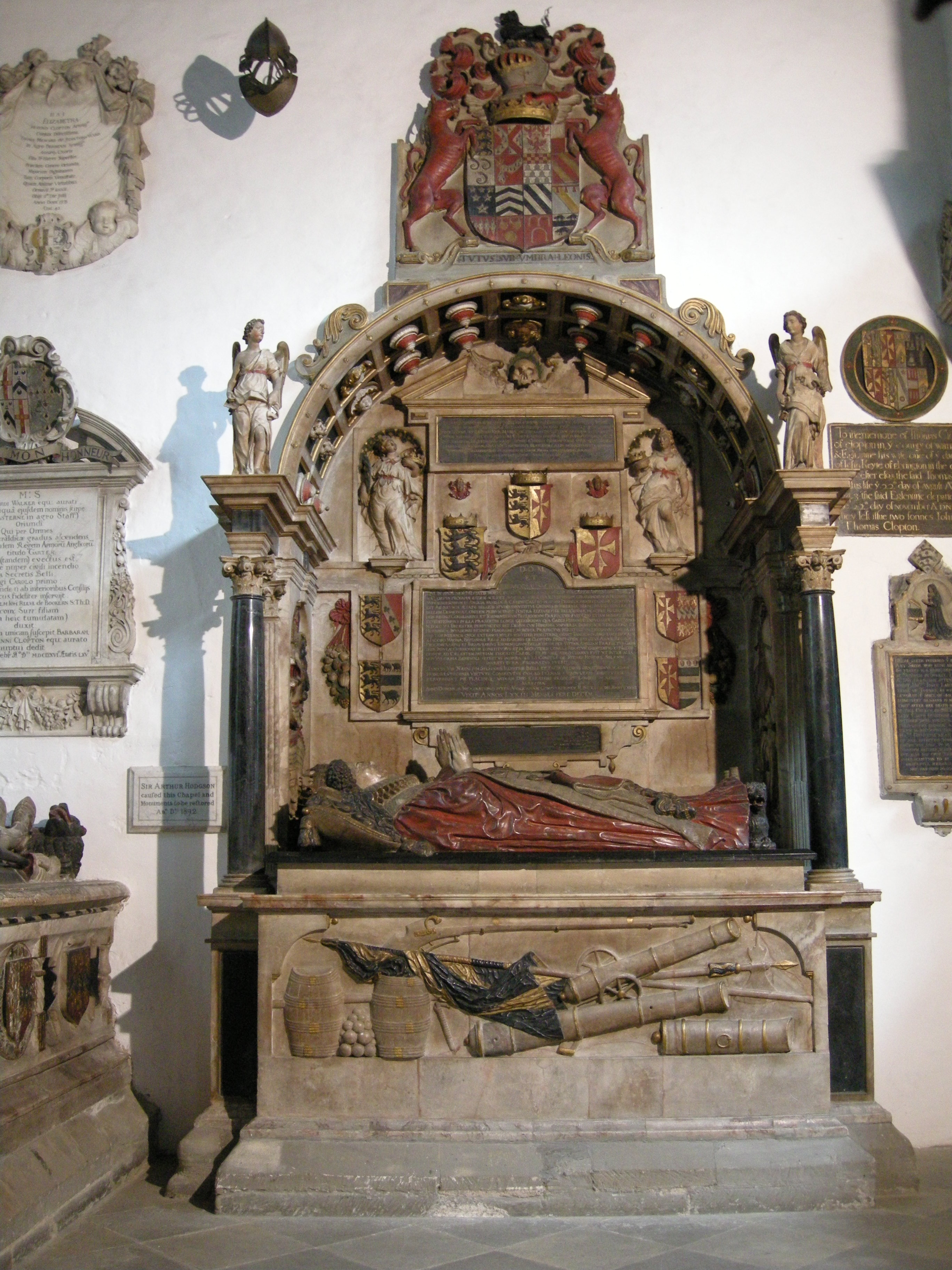
Monument to George Carew, Earl of Totnes (d. 1629), and his wife Joyce Clopton (d. 1637) in the Clopton Chantry Chapel in the Church of the Holy Trinity, Stratford-upon-Avon

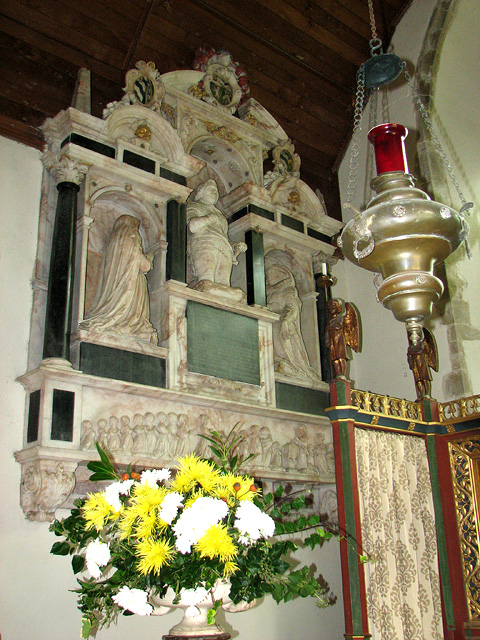
Playters monument at St Margaret's church, Sotterley

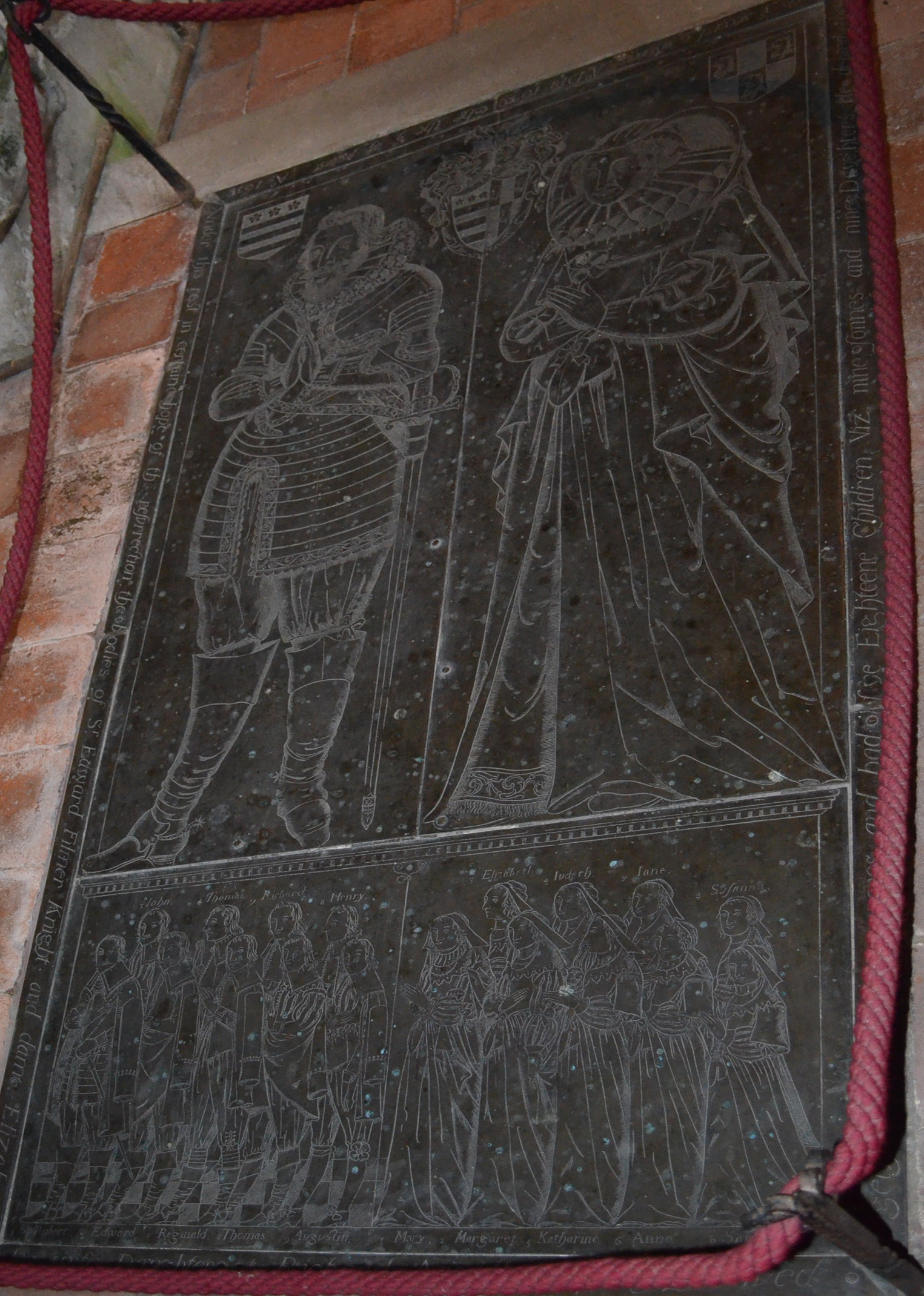
Filmer brass in East Sutton church

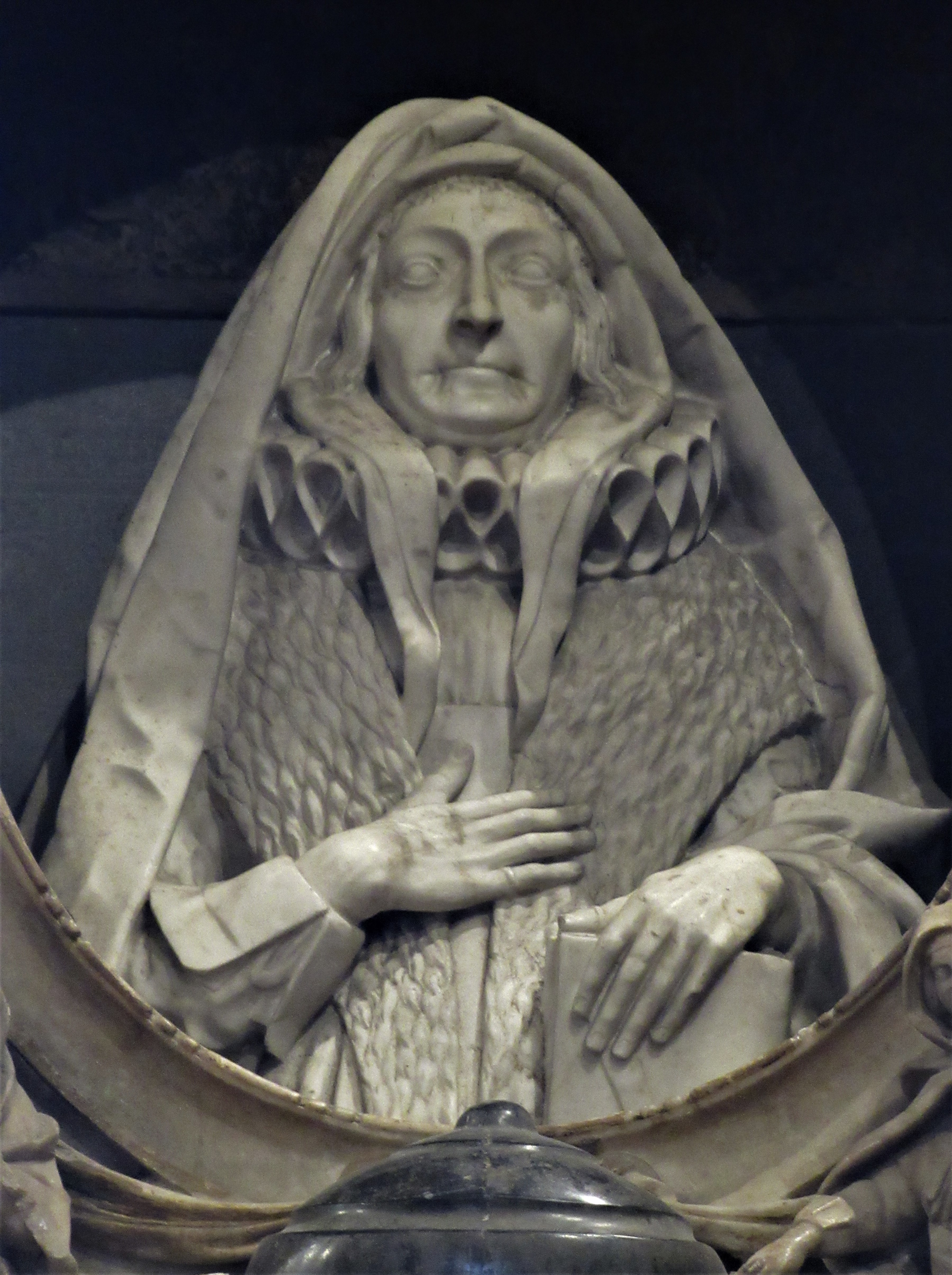
Monument to Dame Dorothy Selby, St Peter's Church in Ightham (detail)

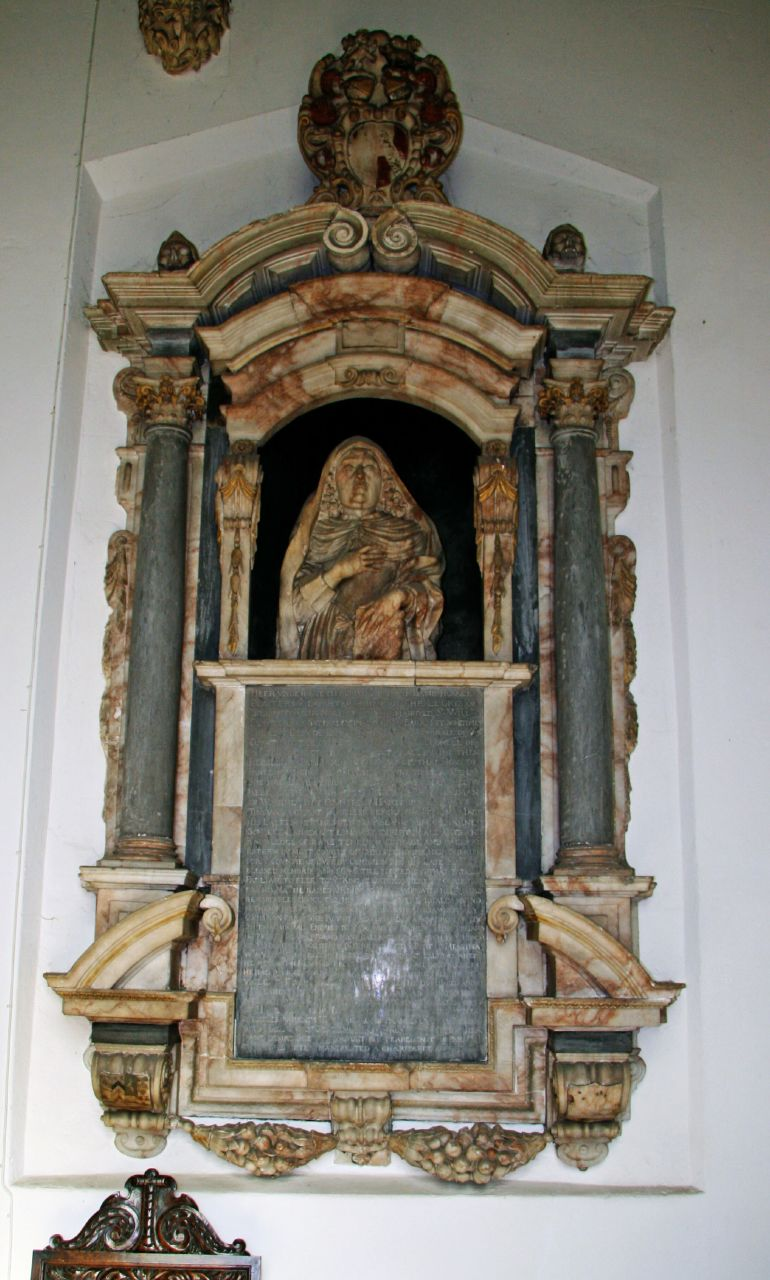
Monument to Lady Playters at All Saints church in Dickleburgh, Norfolk
