= Sugar Quay =

Quay in London, England

Coordinates: 51.50827°N 0.08086°W

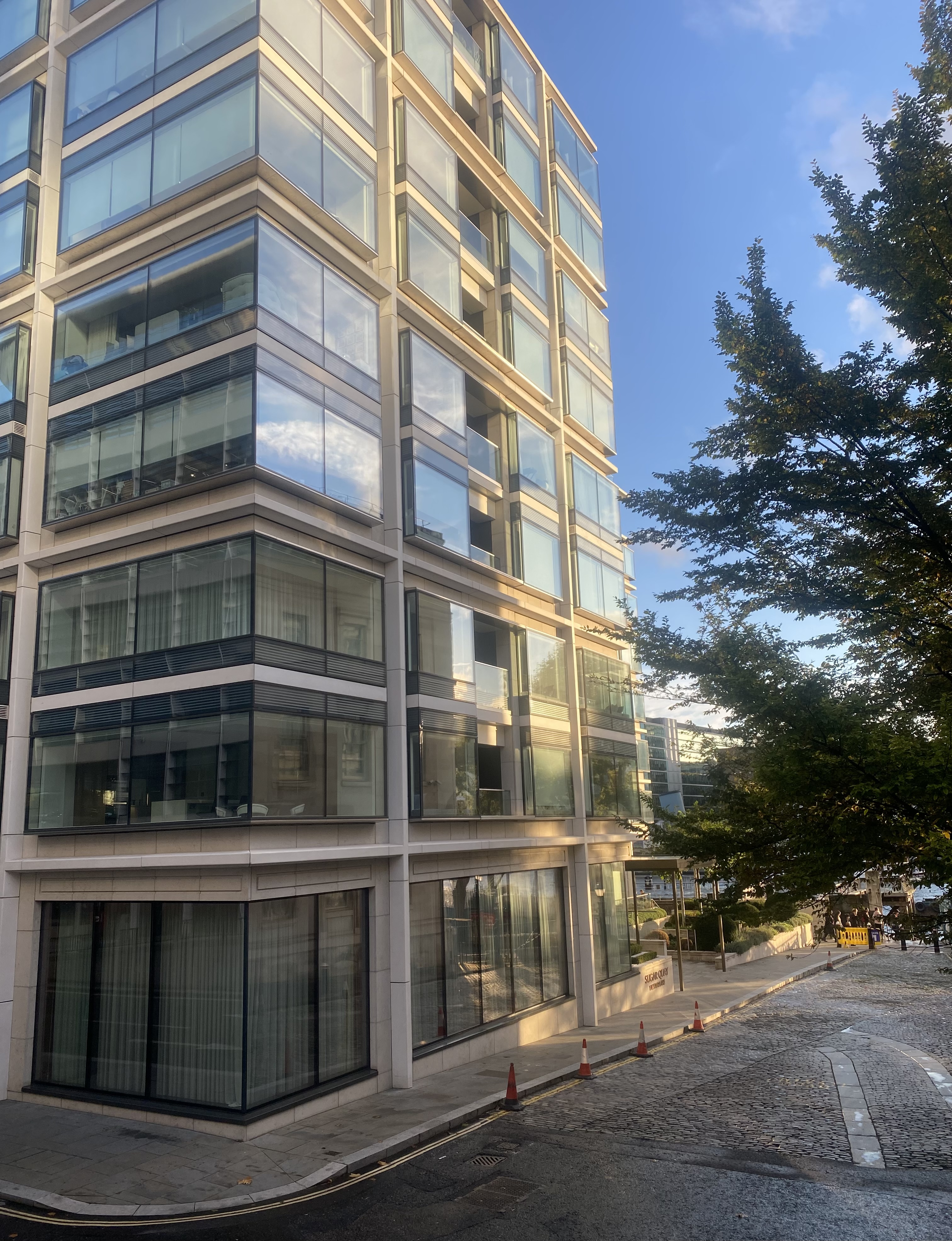
Sugar Quay in 2021

Sugar Quay is a quay alongside the Thames in the City of London, England.

== Location ==
The quay is located on the north bank of the Thames, between Custom House and the Tower of London. It stands between Lower Thames Street and the Thames, on Water Lane EC3R.

== History ==
The quay was named after the cane sugar trade, which relies on Caribbean plantations originally worked by African slaves.

As early as 1377, the site was known as Wool Quay and was the location of a custom house used to collect duties due on exported wool. In 1380, John Churchman is recorded as building a custom house on the site, which stood until 1559 when construction of a new custom house was overseen by William Paulet, 1st Marquees of Winchester and Lord High Treasurer. Paulet's structure was destroyed in 1666 in the Great Fire of London.

A new building was designed by Christopher Wren and completed in 1671, being built by the King's Master Mason Joshua Marshall. This structure was damaged by fire in 1715, and was deemed too badly damaged to save. The final iteration of the custom house on the site was built to a design by Thomas Ripley, and remained in use until the early 19th century. At this time, the growth in trade and increase in duties due on goods necessitated the construction of a larger replacement building. Construction of the new Custom House began in October 1813 on a site immediately to the west of Sugar Quay. On 12 February 1814, a fire began in the housekeeper's quarters of Ripley's custom house building, which due to the large volume of spirits, plus smaller amounts of gunpowder, stored on the site resulted in an explosion which destroyed Ripley's custom house at Sugar Quay.

By 1934, the site was referred to alternatively as Wool Quay or Custom House Quay, and was recorded as being in the ownership of Wm. H. Müller and Co., owner of the Batavier Line which operated a steam ship passenger service between Rotterdam and London. Since 1899, the quay had been used as a berth for the ships.

In 1970, architect Terry Farrell designed an office building for British sugar company Tate and Lyle. The development included its own private jetty extending out over the Thames foreshore for outdoor recreational functions.

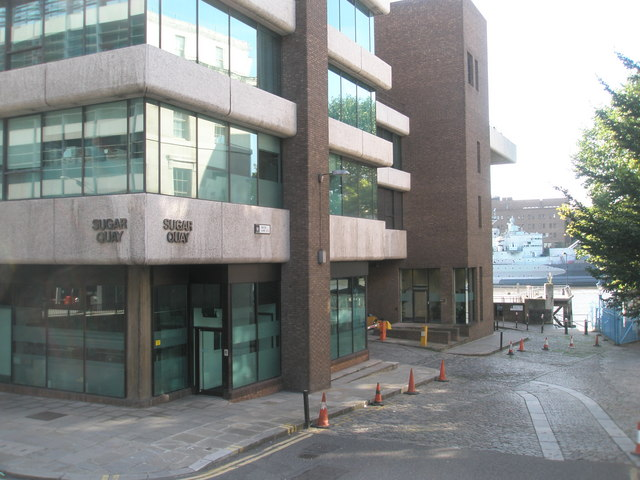
Tate and Lyle building at Sugar Quay

In May 2014, it was announced that Barratt Developments and CPC Group (owned by Christian Candy) would develop 165 luxury apartments across 11 storeys. The Sugar Quay development contains a mixed use ground floor incorporating residential facilities and amenities, and a waterfront commercial unit. Moreover, the CPC Group is redeveloping 110,000 square feet into a 230,000 square feet of office buildings. Construction involved closure of the Thames Riverside Walk (part of the Thames Path) for some years, which only reopened again in March 2019.
