= St Sepulchre-without-Newgate =

Coordinates: 51°31′0.07″N 0°6′8.47″W

Holy Sepulchre London
- Parish Church of the Saint Sepulchre without Newgate
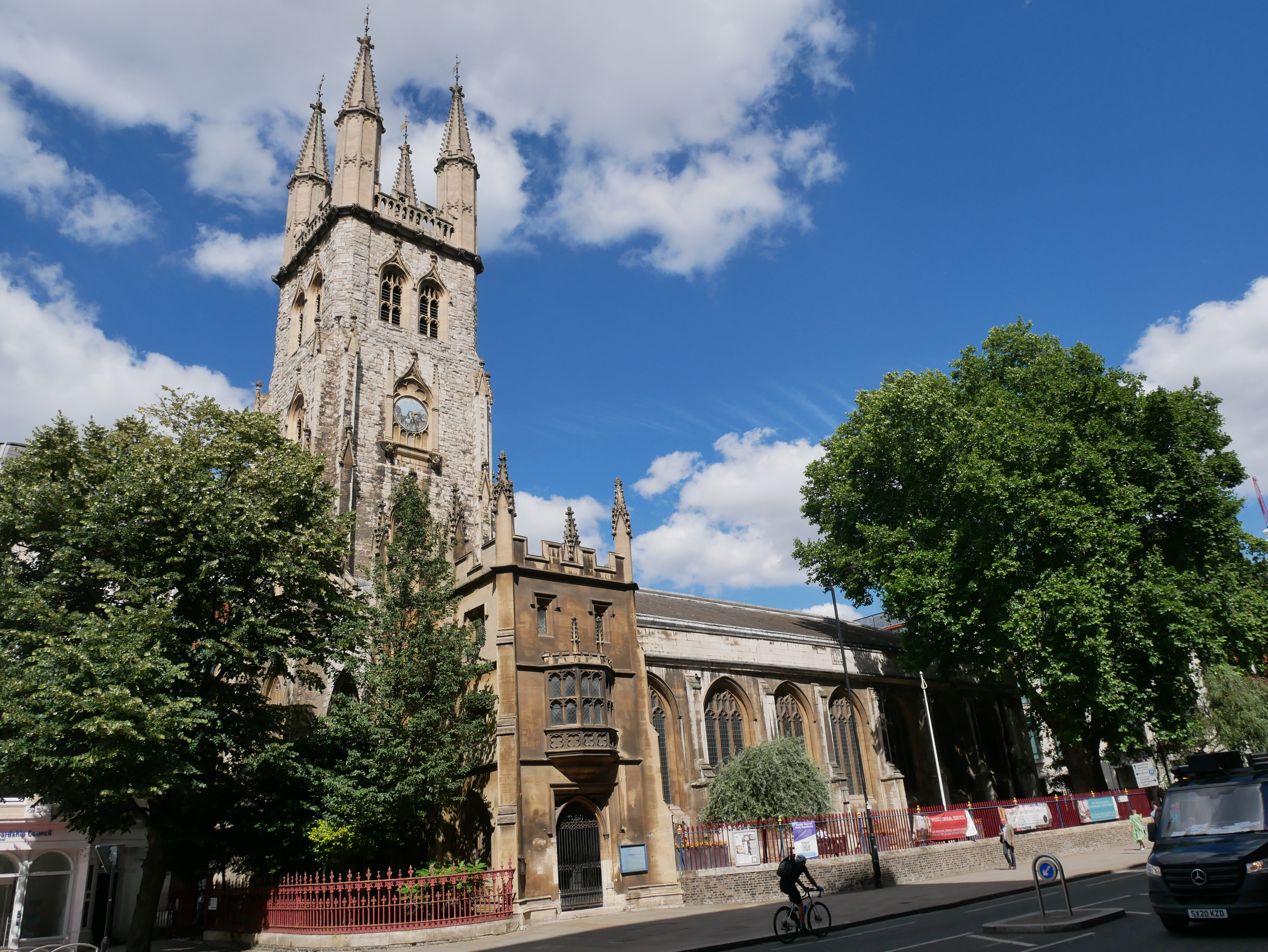

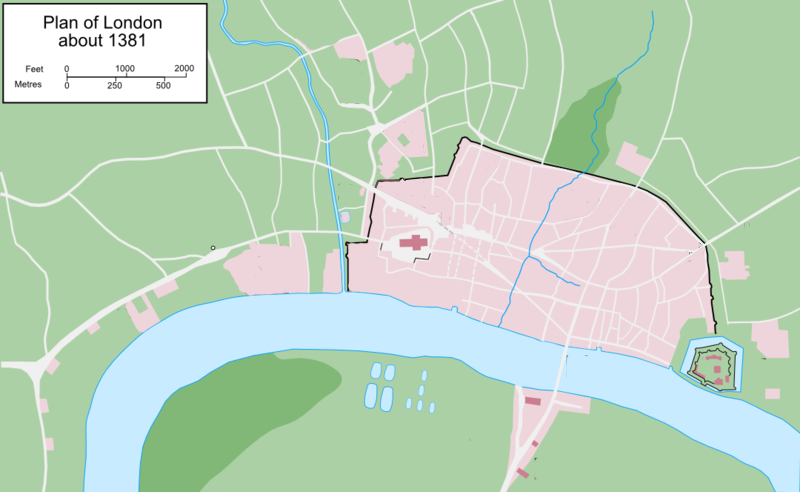
- Location: Holborn Viaduct, London, EC1
- Country: England
- Denomination: Church of England
- Previous denomination: Roman Catholicism (to 1538)
- Churchmanship: Low Church Evangelical
- Website: hsl.church

History
- Former name(s): Church of Saint Edmund, King & Martyr, and the Holy Sepulchre
- Status: Parish church
- Founded: 11th century
- Founder: Canute (traditional)
- Dedication: The Holy Sepulchre
- Earlier dedication: Edmund the Martyr

Architecture
- Functional status: Active
- Heritage designation: Grade I-listed building
- Designated: 4 January 1950
- Architect: Joshua Marshall
- Style: Perpendicular Gothic (Tower); English Baroque
- Years built: mid 15c (rebuilt)
- Completed: 1670 (reopened)

Administration
- Province: Canterbury
- Diocese: London
- Archdeaconry: London
- Deanery: City of London
- Parish: St Sepulchre with Christ Church, Greyfriars and St Leonard, Foster Lane (united benefice)

Clergy
- Bishop(s): Rt Revd & Rt Hon. Dame Sarah Mullally DBE
- Rector: Revd Nick Mottershead FCA

Holy Sepulchre London, formally known as Saint Sepulchre-without-Newgate, is the largest Anglican parish church in the City of London.

Situated at the top of Snow Hill on the north side of Holborn Viaduct by the crossroads next to the Old Bailey and within the Newgate Street Conservation Area, the church has medieval foundations. The parish of St Sepulchre lies in the ward of Farringdon Without and includes Smithfield Market. In the Middle Ages the parish was outside ("without") the city wall, west of the City "New Gate".

Since 1950, Holy Sepulchre Church serves as home to the Royal Regiment of Fusiliers Memorial Chapel, and the Musicians' Chapel since 1955, later being dubbed the National Musicians' Church.

The Musicians' Chapel displays a book of remembrance and holds a requiem in late autumn – unusual for Low Church Evangelicalism.

== History ==
=== Early history ===
The original (pre-Norman) church site was dedicated to St Edmund the King & Martyr, before being given in 1137 by Bishop Roger of Salisbury to the nearby Priory of St Bartholomew. After the Second Crusade the advowson was re-dedicated to St Edmund and the Holy Sepulchre, venerating the Church of the Holy Sepulchre in Jerusalem.

Knights crusading to the Holy Land would attend parochial Mass led by a Canon of St Bartholomew's Priory in Smithfield. The ancient Guild & Fraternity of St Katharine celebrated the Feast of the Immaculate Conception and other Saints days at the church of St Edmund, King & Martyr, and the Holy Sepulchre, until the mid 15th century when they were granted royal charters.

The name became contracted as St Sepulchre, derived from Sanctum Sepulchrum (Latin for Holy Sepulchre) although there is no saint called "Sepulchre", with the royal saint and martyr reference falling into disuse by the 20th century; its 12th-century re-dedication helped its differentiation from another smaller church, also dedicated to St Edmund, King and Martyr, to the east of St Paul's Cathedral.

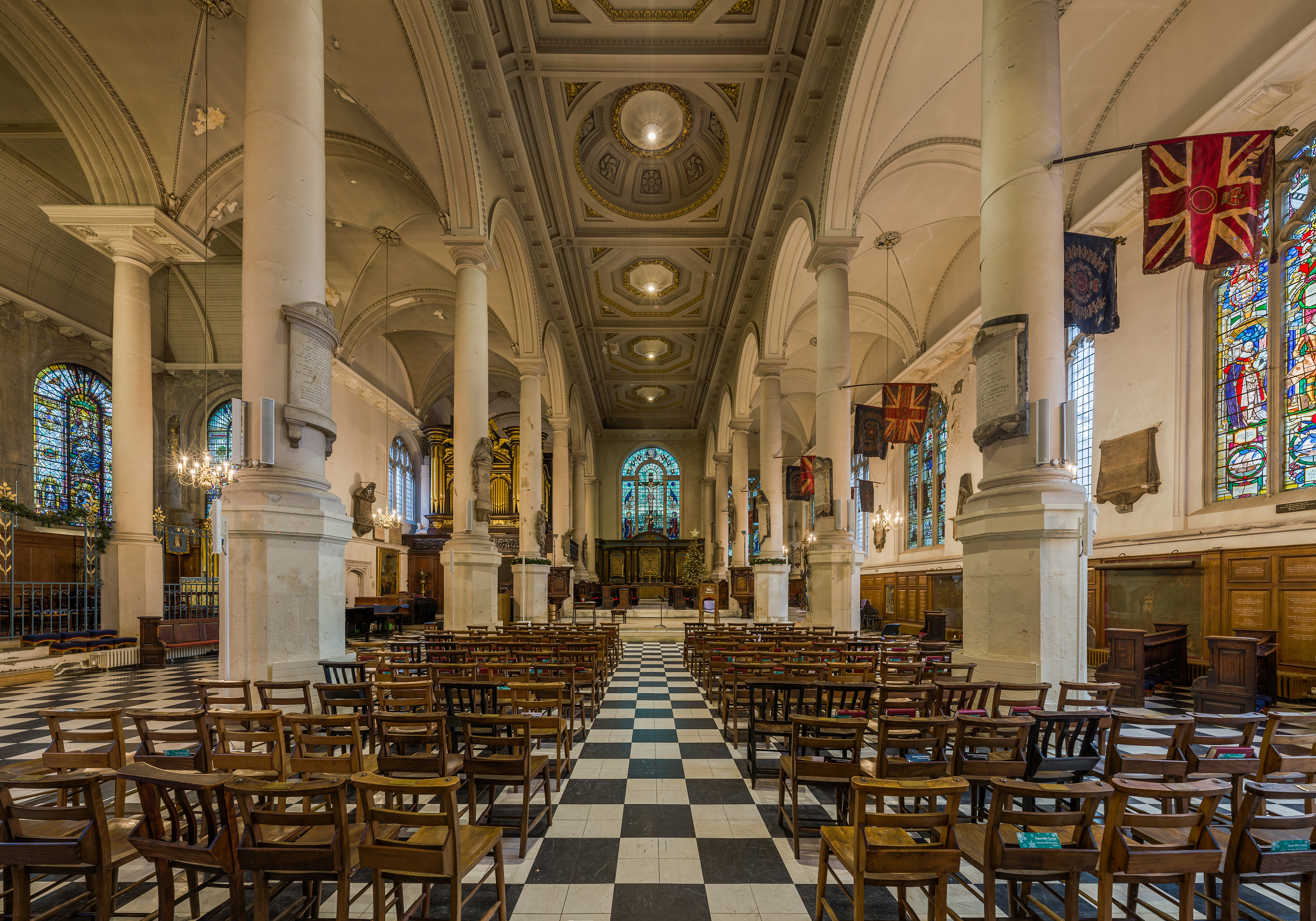
Nave of Holy Sepulchre Church, London

In 1555 the incumbent vicar, Revd John Rogers, Reader of St Paul's, was burned at the stake in Smithfield as a heretic during the religious persecutions under Mary I.

The President and Fellows of St John's College, Oxford, as patrons of the advowson since 1622, retain the right to present, when vacant, a priest for appointment by the Bishop of London.

=== Bells ===
Holy Sepulchre's bells are referred to in the nursery rhyme Oranges and Lemons as the "bells of Old Bailey".

In 1605, Master Merchant Taylor Robert Dowe gave the parish £50 (equivalent to £13,000 in 2025) for commissioning a handbell to mark the execution of prisoners at the nearby gallows at Newgate. This execution bell is displayed in a glass case in the nave. Between the 17th and 19th centuries, the sexton was responsible for ringing it outside the condemned man's cell in Newgate Prison the night before his execution, and announcing the following "wholesome advice":

All you that in the condemned hold do lie,

Prepare you, for to-morrow you shall die;
Watch all, and pray, the hour is drawing near
That you before the Almighty must appear;
Examine well yourselves, in time repent,
That you may not to eternal flames be sent.
And when St Sepulchre's bell to-morrow tolls,
The Lord above have mercy on your souls.
Past twelve o'clock!

Given its proximity to Newgate Prison and the Old Bailey, built on the site of the medieval gaol, certain of its bells, aside from marking time, celebrating weddings and communion, were rung to announce executions. In the first years of the court Holy Sepulchre's bells tolled as the condemned felon was led to Tyburn.

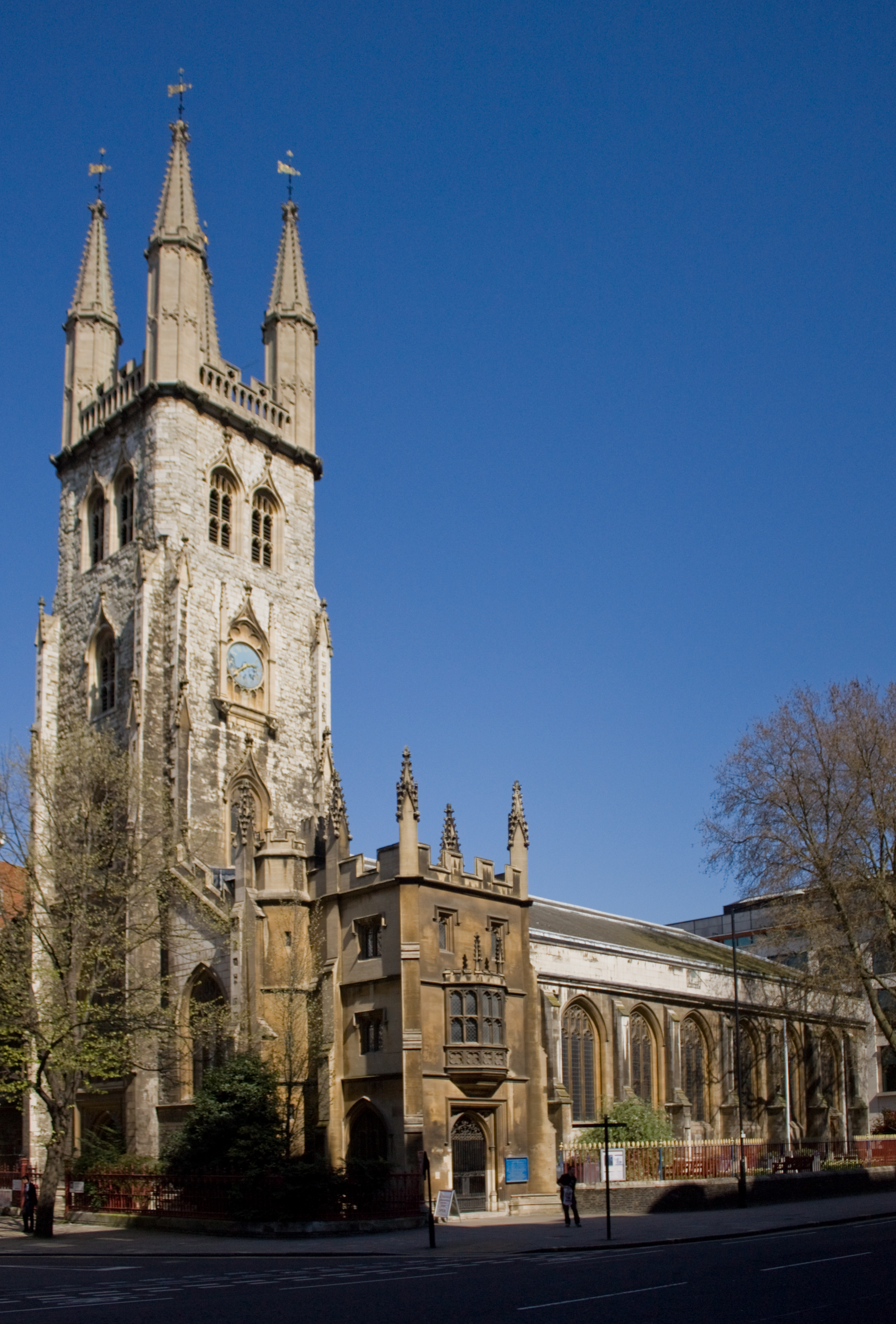
St Sepulchre Church Tower

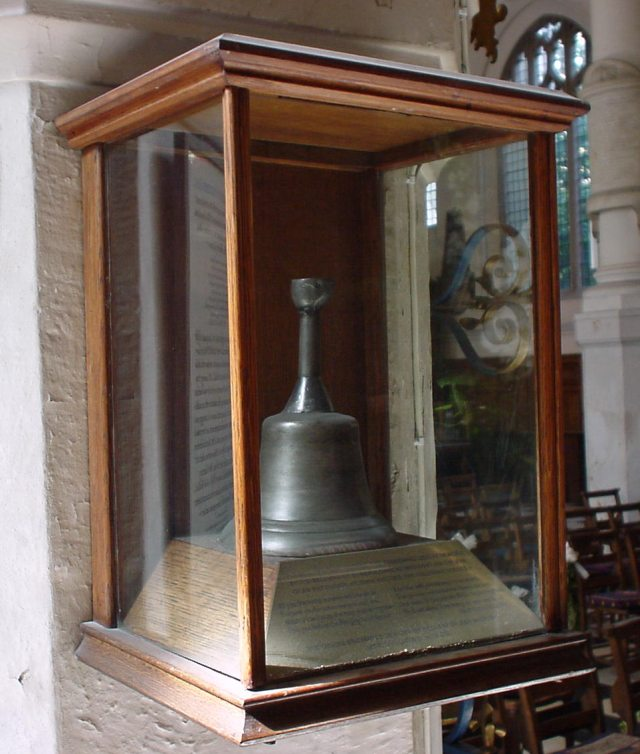
The Execution Bell

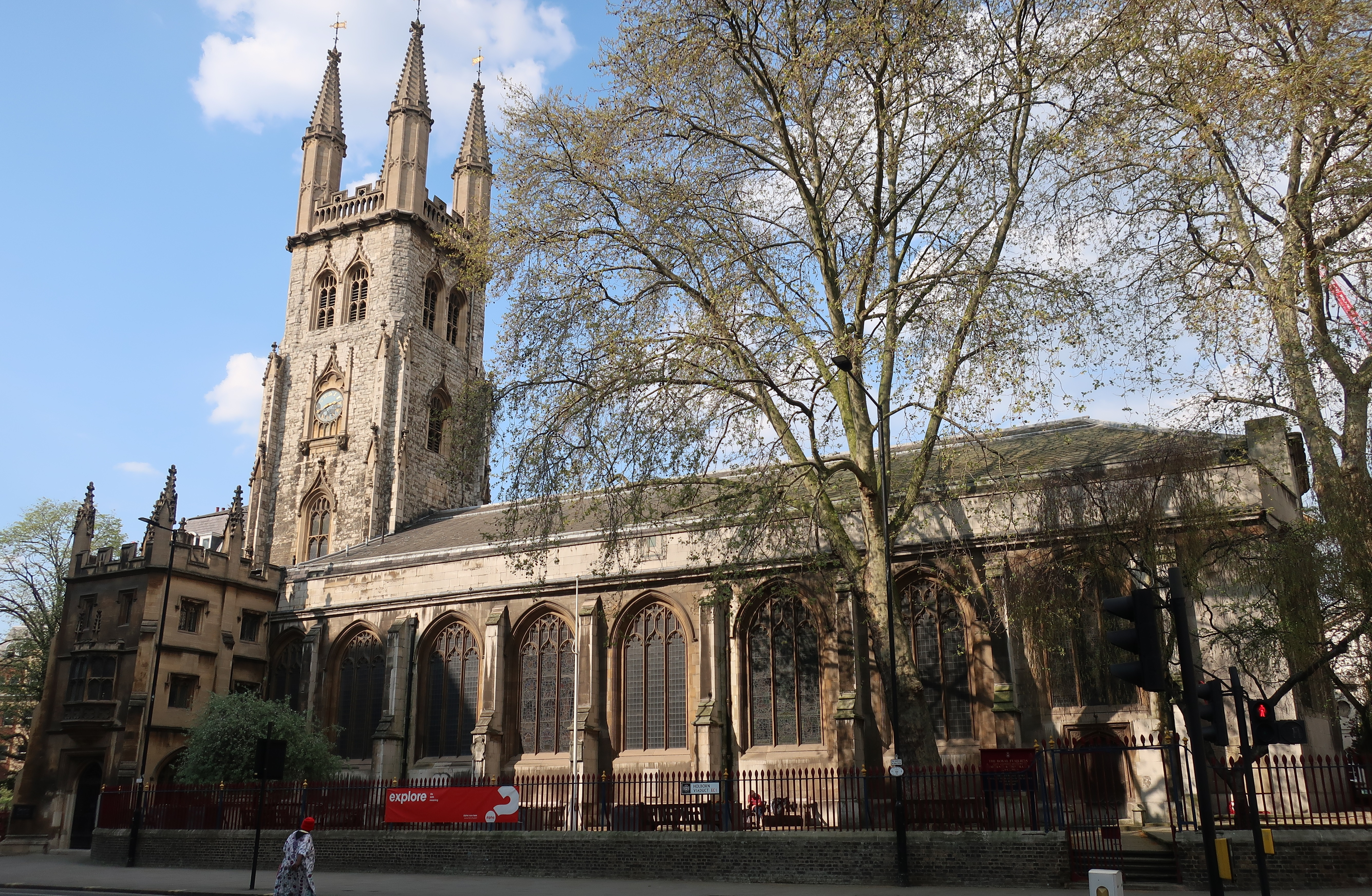
South aspect of St Sepulchre Church,
with its porch on Holborn

=== Army Memorials ===
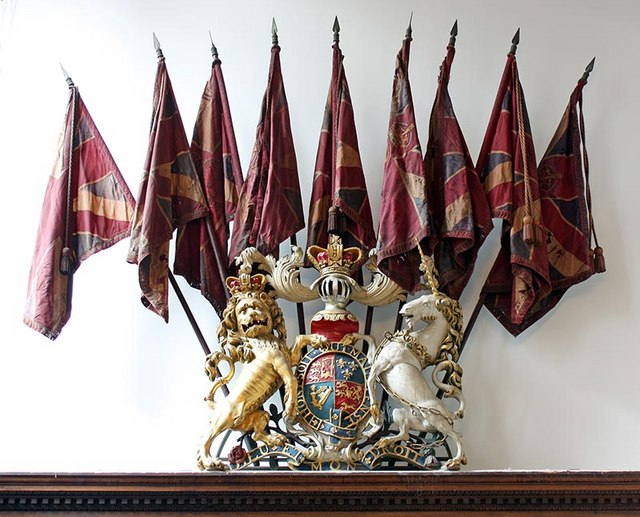
Coat of arms of George II

The Royal Fusiliers (City of London Regiment) Chapel, selected in 1946 for the south aisle of Holy Sepulchre Church, was dedicated in 1950 by the Very Revd Dr W. R. Matthews, Dean of St Paul's. Re-dedicated as the Royal Fusiliers Memorial Chapel after amalgamation in 1968, in the presence of Lord Mayor Sir Gilbert Inglefield, the Regimental Garden of Remembrance is dedicated to all Royal Fusiliers from time immemorial.

At the north aisle's west end are memorials to the City of London Rifles (6th Battalion London Regiment).

=== Musicians' Chapel ===
Beside the north aisle is the Musicians' Chapel, originally known as St Stephen's Chapel, dedicated to the 12th-century monastic St Stephen Harding, where votive Masses were held before the English Reformation and then during the reign of Mary I.

The ashes of conductor Sir Henry Wood, founder of The Proms, who learnt to play the organ at the church as a boy, were interred in St Stephen's Chapel.

It was re-dedicated to musicians on 2 January 1955 by the Dean of St Paul's, in the presence of many distinguished musicians, with Sir Malcolm Sargent conducting an orchestra and the BBC Singers. Its four windows commemorate the composers Walter Carroll and John Ireland, opera singer Dame Nellie Melba and Sir Henry Wood.

The chapel's décor and the Musicians' Book of Remembrance are maintained by the Friends of the Musicians' Chapel. A Service of Thanksgiving for all those in the book is held each year as well as a requiem on or about All Souls' Day. Many concerts and memorial events for musicians continue to be held at Holy Sepulchre, London.

=== Modern history ===
St Sepulchre united with the benefices of Christ Church, Newgate Street and St Leonard, Foster Lane in 1954, its incumbent being titled Rector.

The church was known as the National Musicians' Church for 70 years until August 2017, when hiring of the facilities for non-religious events was banned, against assurances given when HTB took over in 2013. Fifty distinguished luminaries from the musical world, including Aled Jones, Julian Lloyd Webber, James MacMillan, John Rutter, Jane Glover and Judith Weir, signed an open letter urging reversal of the ban and preservation of the church's "unique national cultural remit". 7,800 people signed a petition for the decision to be reversed.The Rt Revd Pete Broadbent, Acting Bishop of London, also tried to convince the church to reverse its ban. Dr Andrew Earis, director of music at St Martin-in-the-Fields and former director of music at Holy Sepulchre, regretted that the church had not changed its decision, which he said was "doing irreparable harm to the church as a whole".

In 2017, the Revd David Ingall, Rector of St Sepulchre-without-Newgate, discontinued parish funds financing the requiem and allowing free rehearsal time. A protest was held and many prominent musicians including Sir John Rutter sought continued benevolence from the wider congregation and church patron; attempts to mediate failed.

Appointed Priest-in-Charge in 2021, the Revd Nick Mottershead FCA was instituted as Rector of St Sepulchre in 2024. Scion of a Cheshire family who became Mercers, Mottershead serves since 2020 as Honorary Chaplain to the Worshipful Company of Fuellers.

Clarifying that Holy Sepulchre Church is no longer a member of the HTB network, its newly-installed Rector in 2024 described his work "to rebuild a reputation around being the Musicians’ Church and to redefine and communicate that this is a place welcoming to all. Faith or no faith, meeting people where they are — all that language is super-important to me." The Revd Fr Nick Mottershead also encouraged the introduction of same-sex blessings and expressed support for same-sex marriage in the future.

== Organ ==
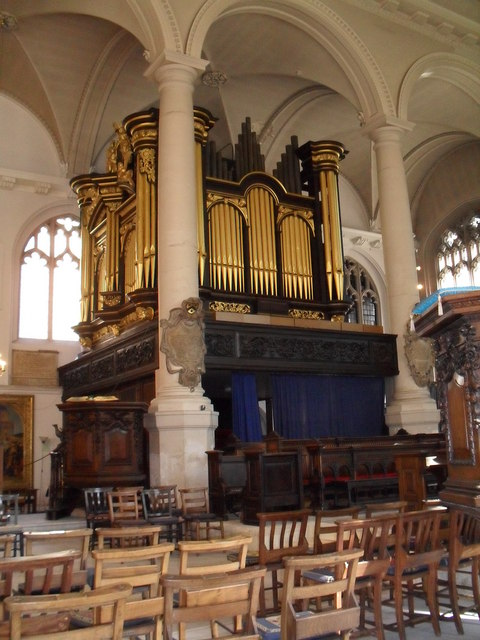
Holy Sepulchre Church pipe organ

The north aisle is dominated by a splendid pipe organ built by Renatus Harris in 1670; the organ case is its sole mention in the National Heritage architectural listing, adding the date of 1677.

The swell was added by John Byfield in c. 1730. The organ was enlarged in 1817 by James Hancock and by John Gray in 1828 and 1835, then Gray & Davison in 1849, 1852 and 1855. Rebuilt in 1932 by Harrison & Harrison, Holy Sepulchre's organ specifications can be found on the National Pipe Organ Register. Not currently playable, efforts are being made to restore the church's pipe organ, a Makin digital organ is used as required for services.

Holy Sepulchre's choir now comprises eight professional singers.

=== Organists ===
- Francis Forcer 1676–1704
- Thomas Deane 1705–1712
- Benjamin Short 1712–1760
- William Selby and Samuel Jarvis 1760–1773
- Samuel Jarvis 1773–1784
- George Cooper 1784–1799
- George Cooper 1799–1843 (son of above)
- George Cooper 1843–1876 (son of above)
- James Loaring
- Edwin Matthew Lott
- Edgar Pettman
- Frank Basil Fowle 1924–1958
- Peter Asprey (Director of Music–present)
- Joshua Ryan (Organist-elect)

== Architecture ==
Now the largest parish church in the City, Holy Sepulchre was completely rebuilt in the 15th century but was gutted by the Great Fire of London in 1666, which left standing only the outer walls, the tower and the porch.

Rebuilt between 1667 and 1679 by Joshua Marshall, the King's Master Mason, Holy Sepulchre appears to be remodelled to Marshall's own design. Lightly modified in the 18th century, the interior of the church is a wide, roomy space with a coffered ceiling installed in 1834, with plasterwork completed three years later. The church underwent considerable re-facing and alterations in 1878, then remodelling by Sir Charles Nicholson in 1932.

During the Second World War its 18th-century watch house, built in the churchyard to deter grave-robbers, was bomb-struck but later rebuilt. The church has been designated a Grade I-listed building (the highest grade) since 1950. St Sepulchre Vicarage on Giltspur Street was fully renovated when the incumbent, Revd Dr Peter Mullen, was serving as the Lord Mayor's Chaplain in 2001/02.

== Notable people associated with Holy Sepulchre Church ==
- Thomas Cromwell (1699–1748), great-grandson of Lord Protector Oliver Cromwell, was a parishioner
- Thomas Culpeper, Tudor courtier, buried here
- Thomas Fiennes, 9th Baron Dacre, Tudor nobleman, buried here
- Sir Thomas Davis, Pepys' bookseller and Lord Mayor of London 1676/77, is buried here
- Revd Thomas Gouge, Vicar ejected as a Presbyterian in 1662
- Samuel Gurney MP, erected the first drinking fountain for the Metropolitan Drinking Fountain & Cattle Trough Association on the railings of St Sepulchre Church, restored in 1913, where it remains
- General George Augustus Eliott, 1st Baron Heathfield, married Anne Drake here in 1748
- Revd Dr Peter Mullen, Rector 1998–2012, sometime Chaplain to the London Stock Exchange and writer
- Sir Charles Nicholson Bt FRIBA, remodelled the interior in 1932
- Francis Phillips (1575–1622), auditor of the Royal Exchequer and patron of the living
- Sir Hugh Platt and his son, William Platt, were parishioners
- Revd John Rogers, Reader of St Paul's, Bible translator and the first English Protestant martyr under Mary I
- Sir Anthony St Leger, Tudor judge, and his first wife Dame Eleanor née Markham, buried in 1613 and 1599 respectively
- Captain Sir John Smith, Governor of Virginia whom Princess Pocahontas rescued, buried 1631 in the south aisle; also commemorated by a window designed by Francis Skeat and installed in 1968
- Austin Osman Spare, artist, attended the church school, now a physiotherapy centre, behind the church in Snow Hill Court
- Sir George Whitmore, Master Haberdasher and Lord Mayor, was a parishioner and father-in-law of Edmund Sawyer MP
- Revd Roger Williams (1603–1683), founder of Rhode Island, British America
- Sir Henry Wood, founding conductor at the BBC Proms
- Charles Wriothesley, long-serving Windsor Herald at the College of Arms and chronicler, buried 1562 in the middle aisle.

== See also ==
- List of churches and cathedrals of London
- Priory of St Bartholomew, London
