= Joshua Marshall (sculptor) =

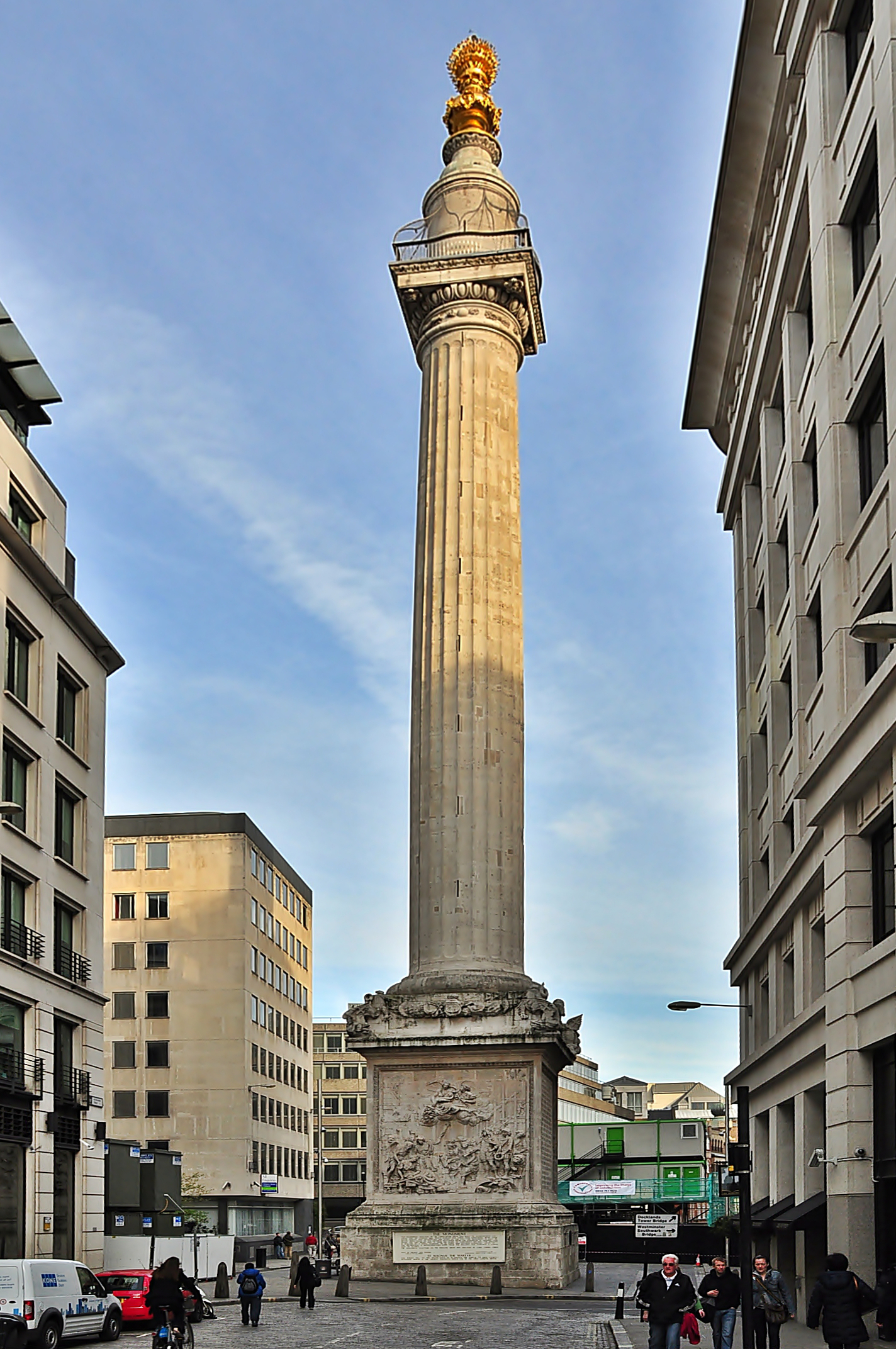
The Monument, designed by Sir Christopher Wren and built by Marshall

Joshua Marshall (1628–1678) was an English mason and sculptor. As the King's Master Mason at the time of the Great Fire of London, he was responsible for many of the rebuilding projects. He worked closely with Christopher Wren and was the builder of several "Wren churches".

== Life ==
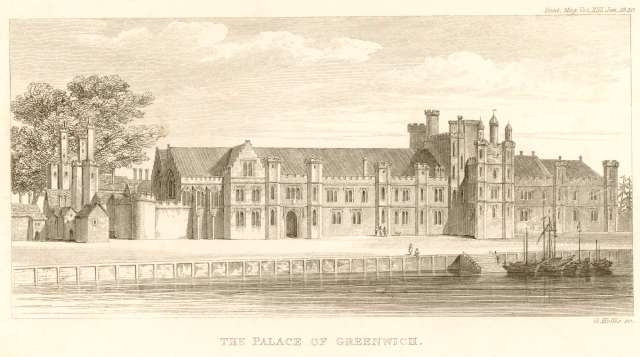
North front of Greenwich Palace

He was born in a house on Fetter Lane in London on 24 June 1628, the eldest son of the sculptor Edward Marshall. He became the Warden of the Worshipful Company of Masons in 1666 and Master of the Company in 1670. He was appointed Master Mason to the Crown in place of his father, and in that role worked on several royal palaces.

Marshall lived in the parish of St Bride's Church and attended church there. He had premises on Shoe Lane, just off Fleet Street. As Master Mason to the King and as a regular contractor for the works of Wren, he was one of the many masons who worked on St Paul's Cathedral although his specific work on the cathedral is not clear.

He was the principal builder of The Monument to the Great Fire of London, completed in 1677, and was paid the huge sum of £11,300 for this task out of the total cost of £13,450 (around £1.9 million in 2021)

He died in London on 6 April 1678 and was buried at St Dunstan-in-the-West. In his will he left £200 to be given to the widows of masons in London.

== Works ==
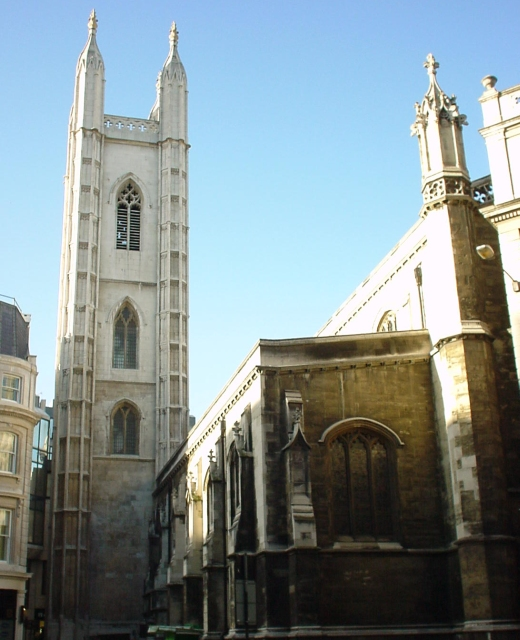
St Mary Aldermanbury

- Monument to Sir William Thorold at St Giles-in-the-Fields (1649)
- Monument to John Whatton in Leicester Cathedral (1656)
- Monument to Elizabeth Sherard at North Witham (1658)
- Monument to John Turner at Kirkleatham (1659)
- Monument to Henry Hammond at Hampton Lovett (1660)
- Monument to Richard Brownlow at St Peter and St Paul's Church, Belton (c.1660), erected several decades after Brownlow died
- Monument to Lady Frances Kniveton at St Giles-in-the-Fields (1663)
- Monument to Lady Anne Holbourne at St Giles-in-the-Fields (1663)
- Monument to Lord and Lady Noel at Chipping Campden (1664)
- Chimney-pieces for the Palace of Whitehall (1664 to 1667)
- Monument to Bishop John Warner in Rochester Cathedral (1666)
- Frontage of the Palace of Whitehall facing onto the Thames (1666/7)
- North facade and internal fireplaces at Greenwich Palace (1666/7)
- Repairs to Rochester Cathedral (1667)
- Church of St Sepulchre-without-Newgate in London (1667–1670) to his own design
- Coat-of-Arms at Cleave's Almhouses in Kingston, Surrey (1670)
- Temple Bar Gate (1670–72), aided by Thomas Strong (relocated in 20th century)
- St Mary-at-Hill Church, with Wren (1670–1676)
- St Bride's Church, Fleet Street, with Wren (1670–1684)
- Monument to Lady Dame Dyonis Williamson at St Dunstan-in-the-East (1671)
- New Customs House at Sugar Quay (1671), designed by Wren to replace the Old Customs House destroyed in the Great Fire of London
- Construction of The Monument to the Great Fire of London (1671 to 1673), designed by Wren and Robert Hooke
- St Mary Aldermary (Aldermanbury), with Wren (1671)
- Ornate pedestal for the equestrian statue of King Charles I at Charing Cross (1675)
- Monument to Sir Geoffrey Palmer, 3rd Baronet and Lady Palmer at East Carlton (1675)
- Monument to William Cleave at Cleave's Almhouses in Kingston, Surrey (1676)
- St Stephen Coleman Street, with Wren (1677) (destroyed in Blitz)
- St Peter upon Cornhill, with Wren (1677–1684)
- Monument to the Princes in the Tower in Westminster Abbey (1678)
- St Swithin, London Stone, with Wren (1678) (completed by others, damaged in Blitz, later demolished)
- St Clement Danes, with Wren (1678–1682); spire added by James Gibbs in 1719 (destroyed in Blitz, rebuilt in replica)

== Family ==
He was married to Catherine George daughter of John George. They had five children but only one daughter and two sons survived to adulthood: Anne, John and Edward. Anne married Richard Somers of the Inner Temple.

=== Gallery ===
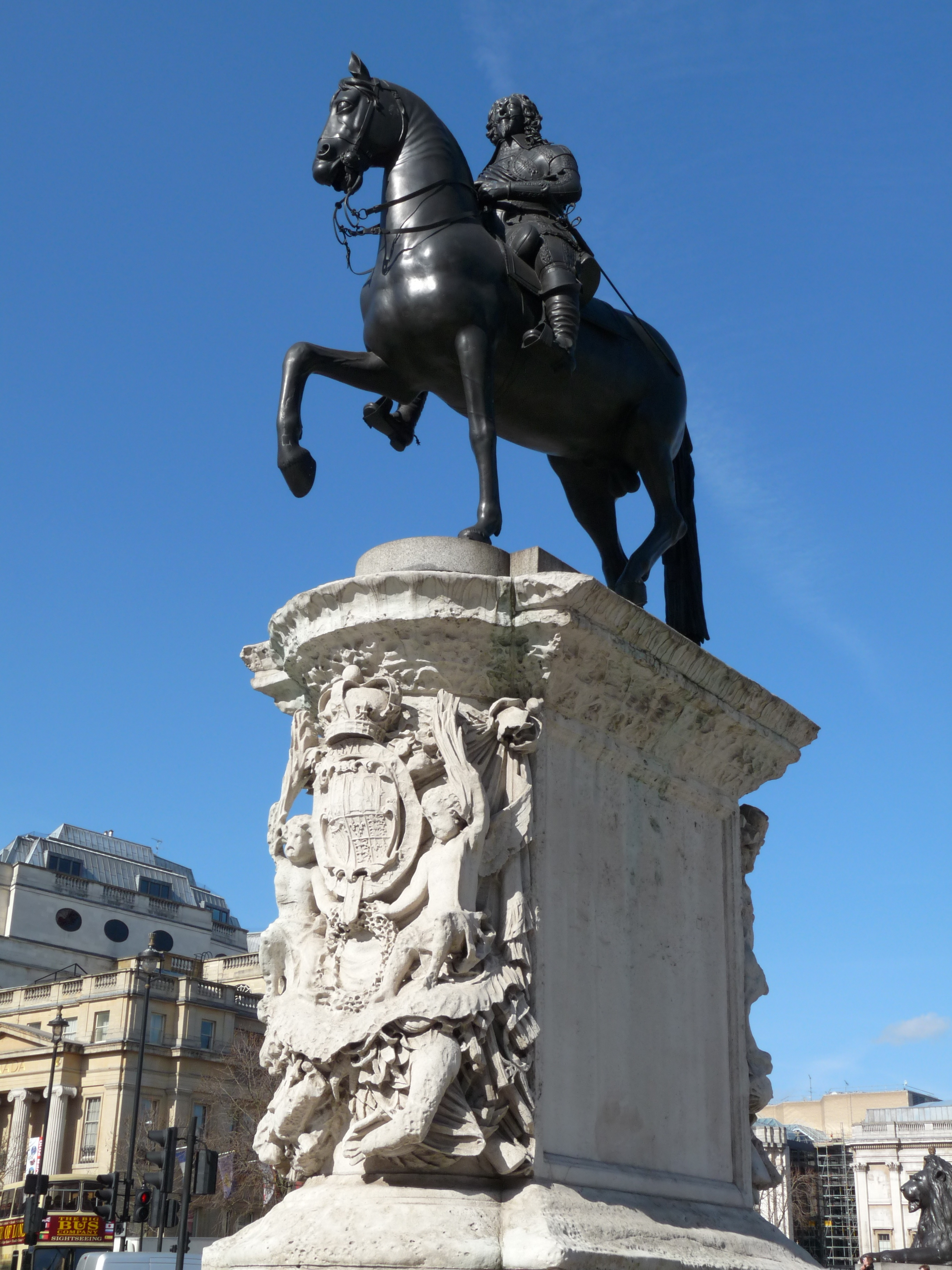
Equestrian statue of Charles I, Charing Cross

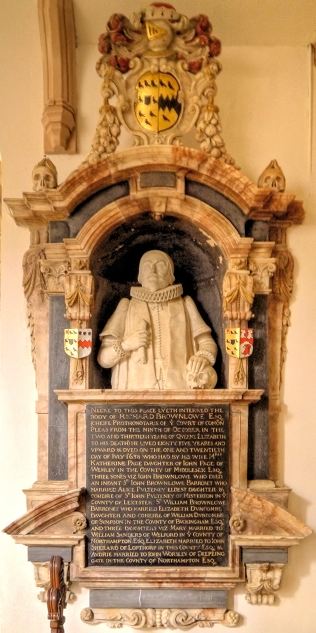
Monument to Richard Brownlow (1553–1638), Belton Church, Lincolnshire

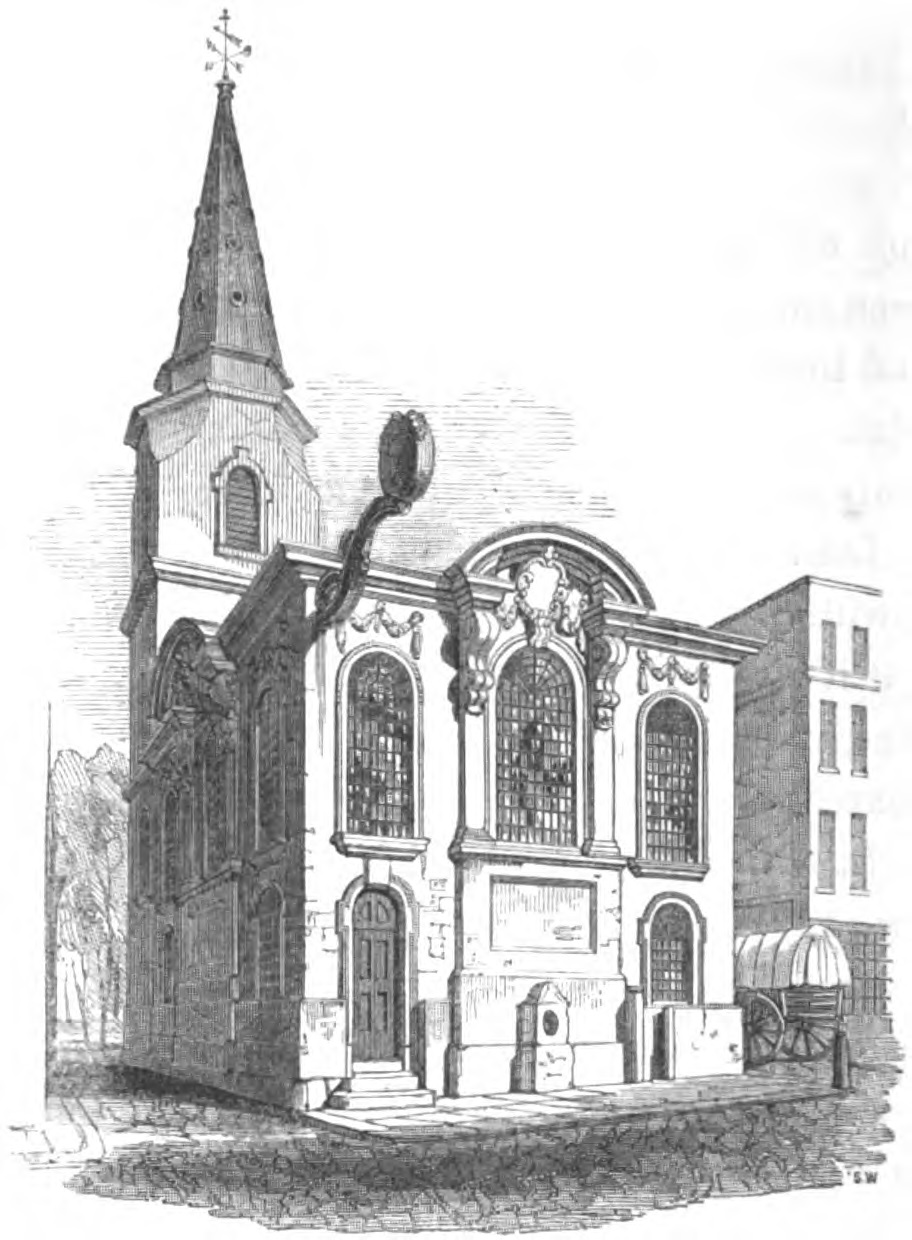
St Swithin, London Stone

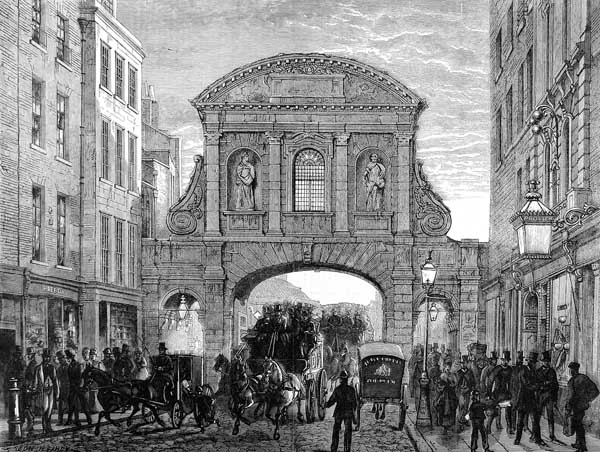
Temple Bar Gate

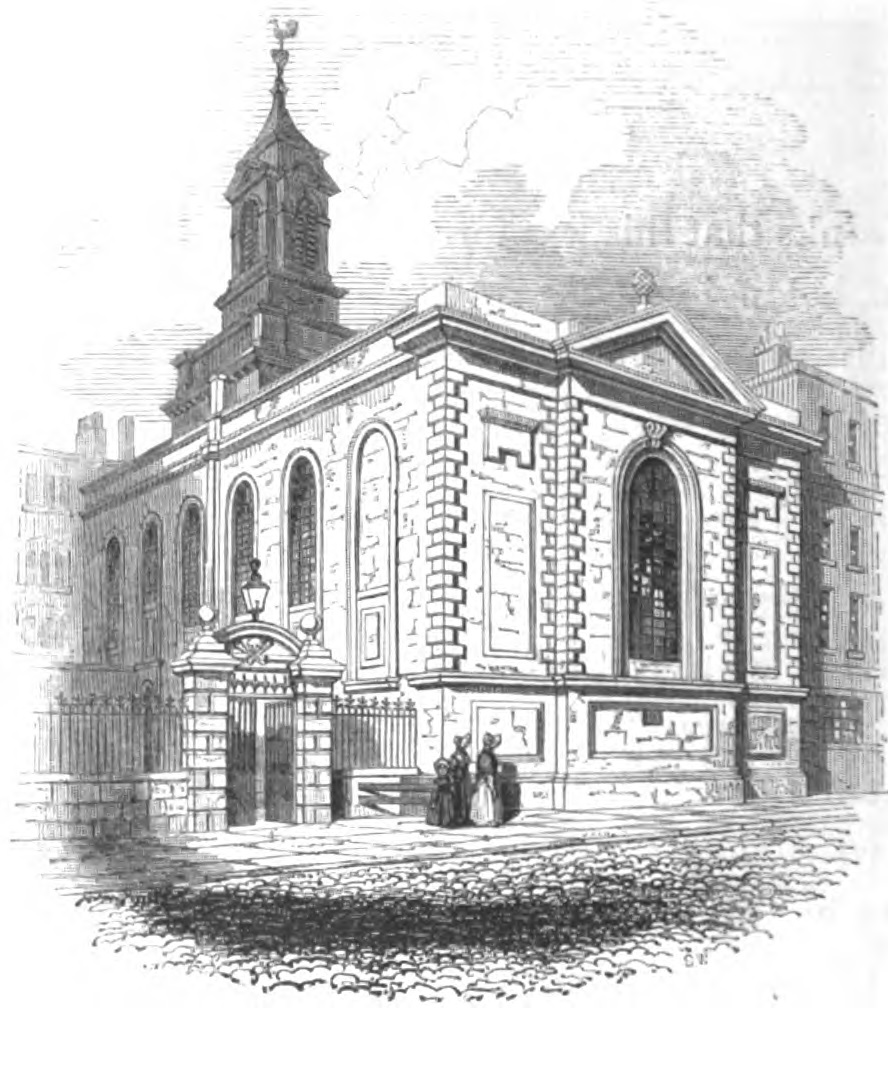
St Stephen Coleman Street

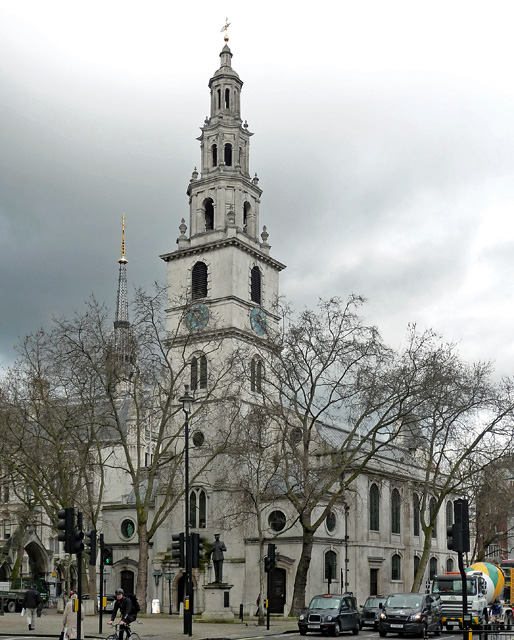
St Clement Danes

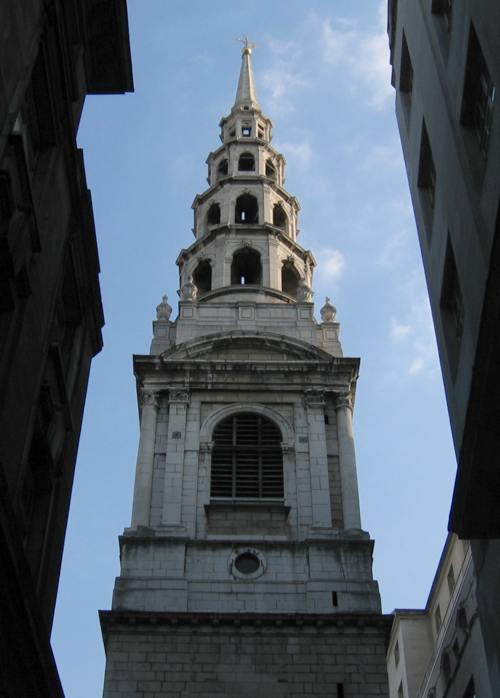
Steeple of St Bride's Church from Fleet Street

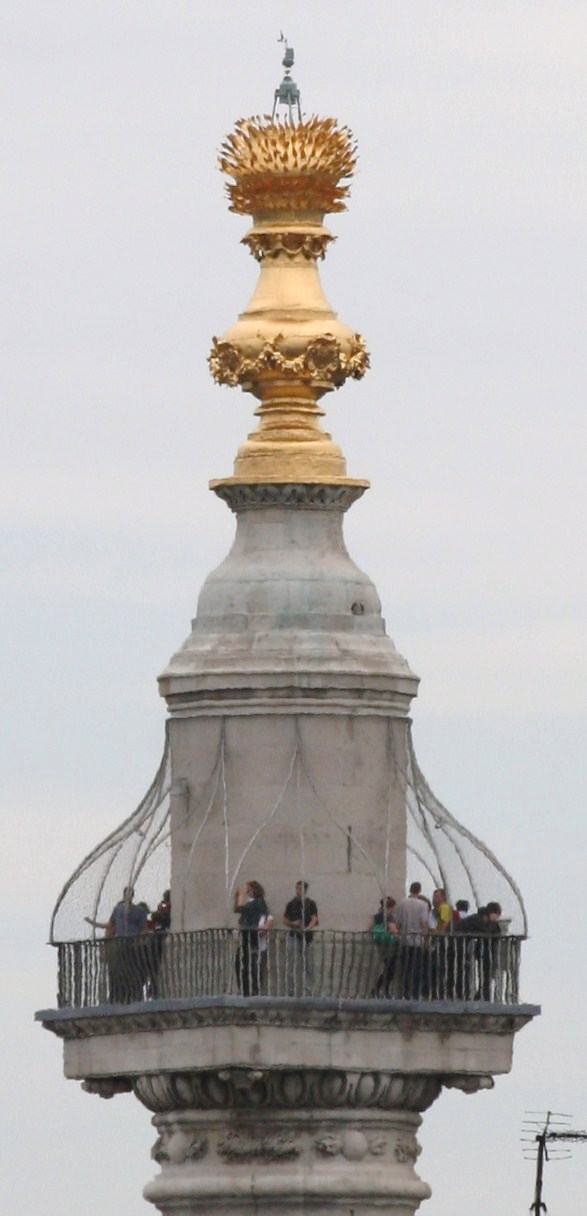
Detail at the top of The Monument

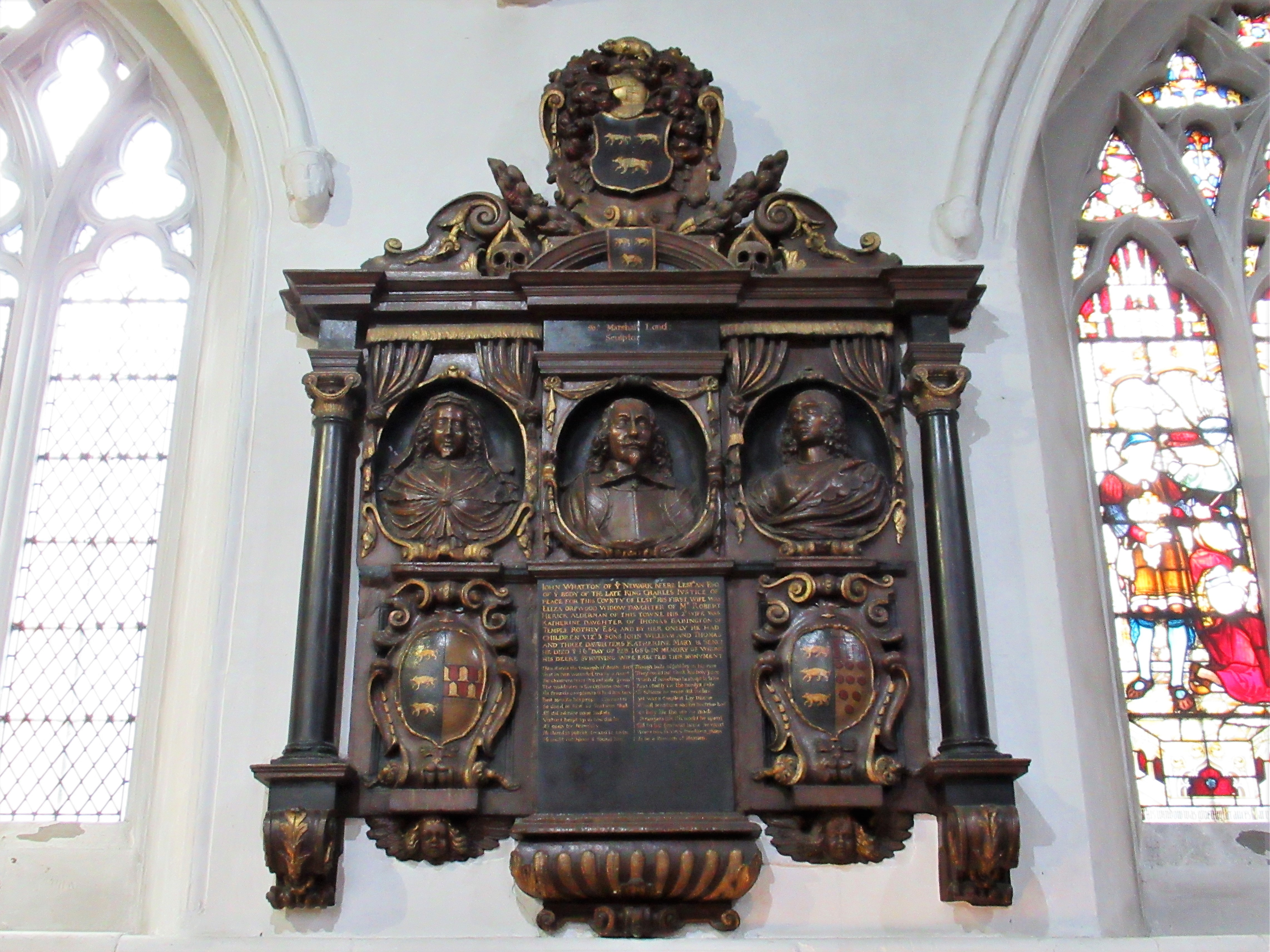
Memorial to John Whatton in Leicester Cathedral

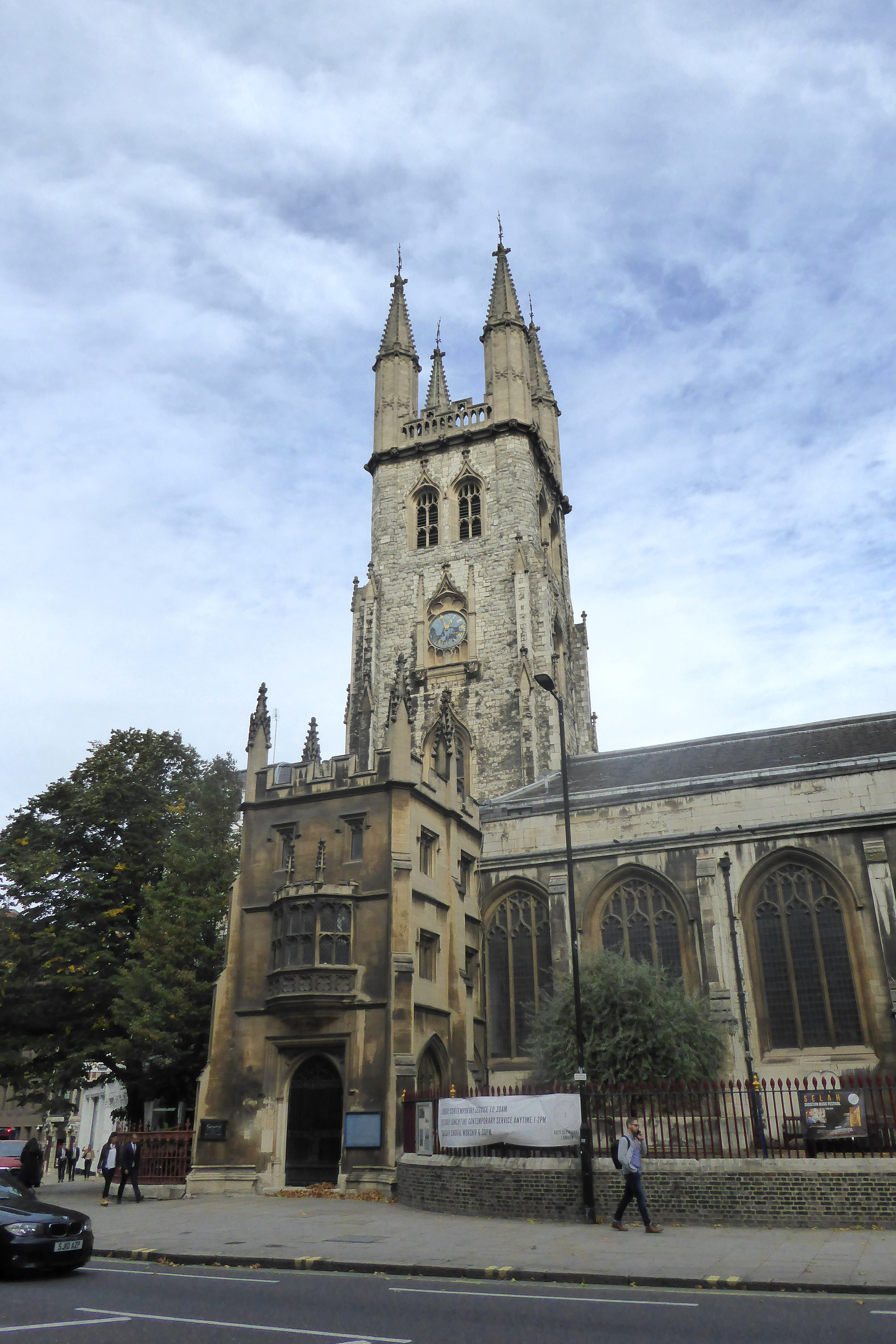
St Sepulchre-without-Newgate Church
