= Peter Mullen =

British Church of England priest

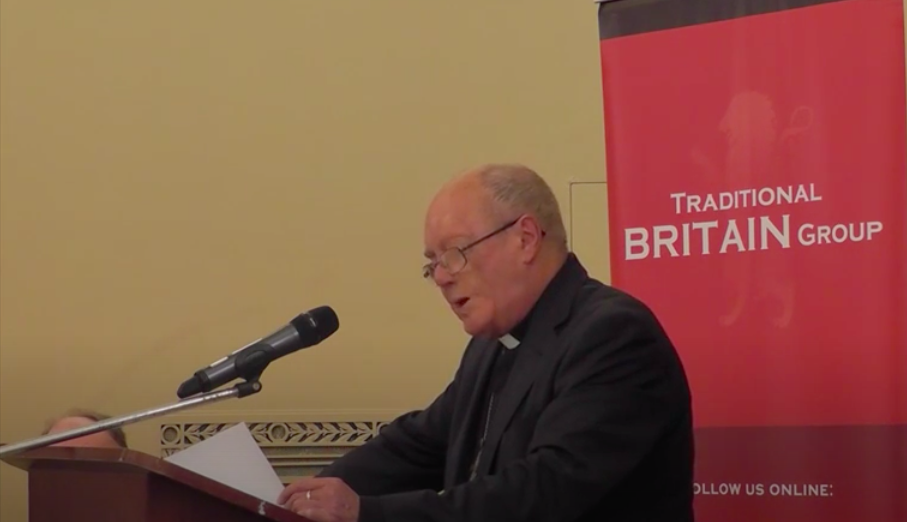
Mullen speaking at the Traditional Britain Group

Peter Mullen (born 11 January 1942) is a British Church of England priest. He is the former Rector of St Michael, Cornhill and St Sepulchre-without-Newgate in the City of London. Mullen was until recently Chaplain to the Honourable Company of Air Pilots, one of the Livery Companies of the City of London and the Anglican Chaplain to the London Stock Exchange, a largely honorific and historical post.

== Life and career ==
Mullen graduated from the University of Liverpool with the degree of BA, before obtaining a PhD from Middlesex University.

He was ordained into the Church of England in 1970. He became Chaplain and Head of Religious Education (RE) at Whitecroft School, Bolton in 1974. In 1977 he was appointed Vicar of Tockwith and Bilton-in-Ainsty with Bickerton, Diocese of York, where he remained until 1989. From 1989 to 1997 he was banned from performing priestly duties, and wrote many books, articles, papers and essays.

In 1998 he became Rector of St Michael's Cornhill and St Sepulchre-without-Newgate, and Chaplain to the Stock Exchange. He was made to retire, against his will, and against the will of his enormously supportive congregation, on his seventieth birthday in January 2012.

=== Views ===
Mullen is noted for his criticism of homosexuality. Writing on his online blog, he stated that homosexuals should carry health warnings, for instance, "Sodomy may seriously damage your health". He later explained that his comments were 'satirical', and went further by saying that he has homosexual friends. Nonetheless, a spokesman for the Diocese of London made an announcement distancing the Bishop and fellow clergy from Mullen's statements, following which these comments were removed from his blog. He later apologised. Mullen has also called for tax-payer funded homosexual parades to be banned, describing them as "obscene".

Mullen is Eurosceptic and in March 2010, he spoke at a United Kingdom Independence Party event in Chichester, where he denounced the European Union and Islam. He has mocked Muslims, saying there could be an "agreeable carnage" at the start of the annual Hajj in Mecca: "They usually manage to stampede and slaughter quite a few hundred of their co-religionists. Just imagine for a moment what a field day the BBC and the left-wing press in England would have if anything even remotely as bad as that happened in Vatican Square at Christmas or Easter". He added that Muslims "lend themselves to ridicule: sticking their arses in the air five times a day. How about a few little choruses, 'Randy Muslims when they die/Find 70 virgins in the sky'?"

Mullen is a frequent contributor to the Wall Street Journal. He has also written for the Daily Telegraph in support of preserving traditional forms of Anglican worship. Mullen has argued it should be permissible to use force against a burglar, even that resulting in death, and that burglars forfeit all their rights by their actions.
