= Custom House, City of London =

Grade I listed building in the United Kingdom

Custom House
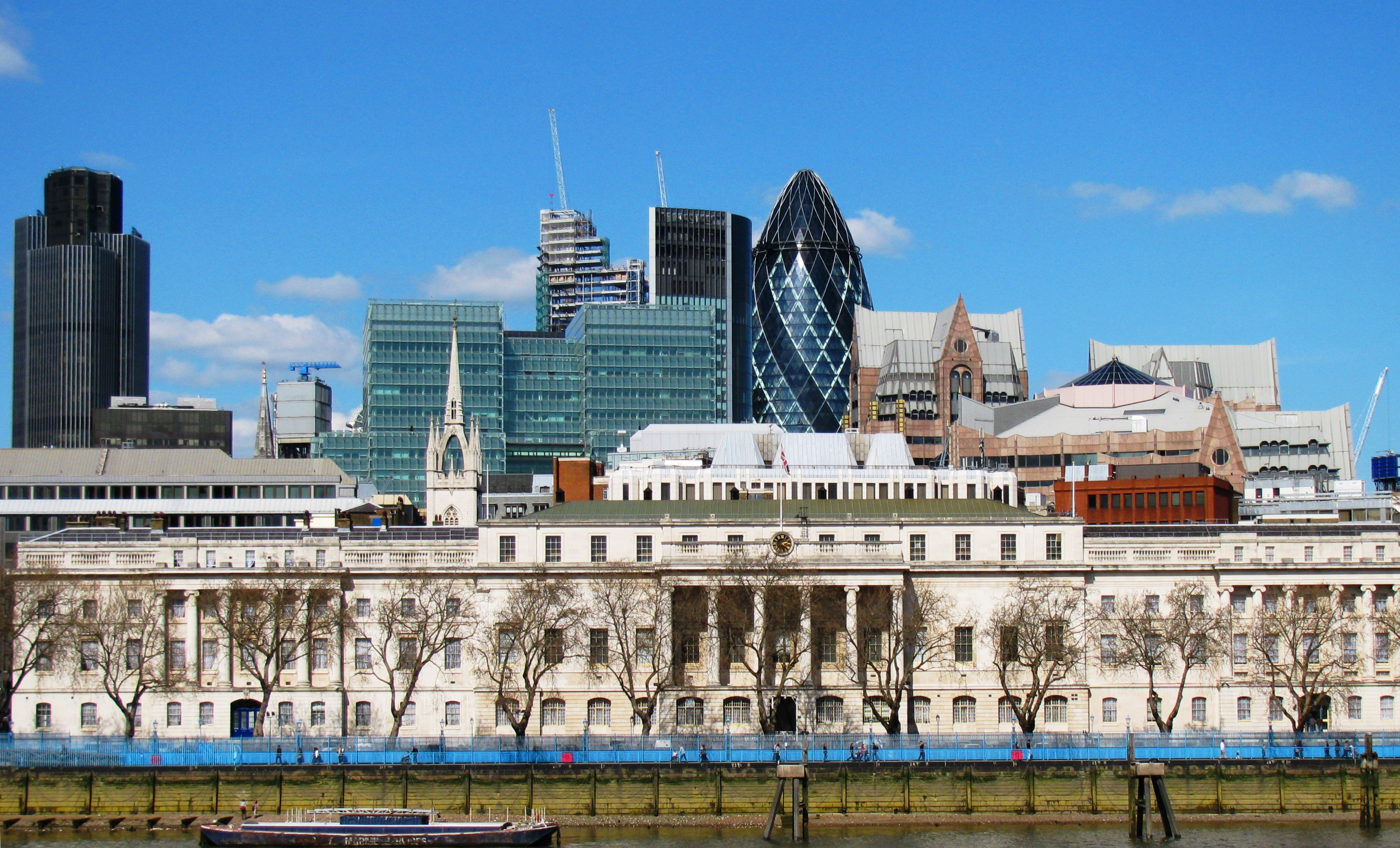
- City of London Custom House

- Location within Central London
- 51°30′31″N 0°04′57″W
- Type: Civic building
- Location: 20 Lower Thames Street, EC3

Site notes
- Area: City of London

Listed Building – Grade I
- Official name: Custom House
- Designated: 5 June 1972
- Reference no.: 1359193

The Custom House, on the north bank of the Thames in the City of London, is a building which was formerly used for the collection of customs duties. A custom house has been present in the area since the 14th century, and a building on its current site has been rebuilt on a number of occasions. Today the Custom House is used by His Majesty's Revenue and Customs. The address is 20 Lower Thames Street, EC3. Custom House is neighboured on the waterfront by Sugar Quay to the east and Old Billingsgate Market to the west.

== History ==
Until 1814, the Custom House stood at Sugar Quay in the parish of All Hallows Barking, immediately to the east of the present site.

The site was long known as "Wool Quay", and, from the medieval period, a custom house was necessary there to levy the duty payable on exported wool. Such a building is recorded as early as 1377. The quay and the buildings on it were privately owned. Around 1380, one John Churchman built a custom house there to collect dues for the City of London, and in 1382 the Crown came to an agreement to use its facilities.

Churchman's custom house remained in use until 1559, the freehold passing through various hands. Its replacement was erected under the direction of William Paulet, Marquess of Winchester, the Lord High Treasurer. A print from 1663 shows it as a three-storey building, with octagonal staircase towers. This structure was destroyed in the Great Fire of 1666.

The post-fire replacement was on a rather larger scale, to the designs of Christopher Wren. The original estimate was for £6,000, but the eventual cost was more than £10,000. The new building was short-lived: in January 1715 a fire, which began in a nearby house, damaged it beyond repair, and a new, larger structure was built to the designs of Thomas Ripley, "Master-Carpenter" to the board of Customs. This necessitated the acquisition of ground to the north, fronting onto Thames Street, and the east. The main body of the new building, however, had the same plan as Wren's, and may have re-used its foundations, but was of three, rather than two storeys.

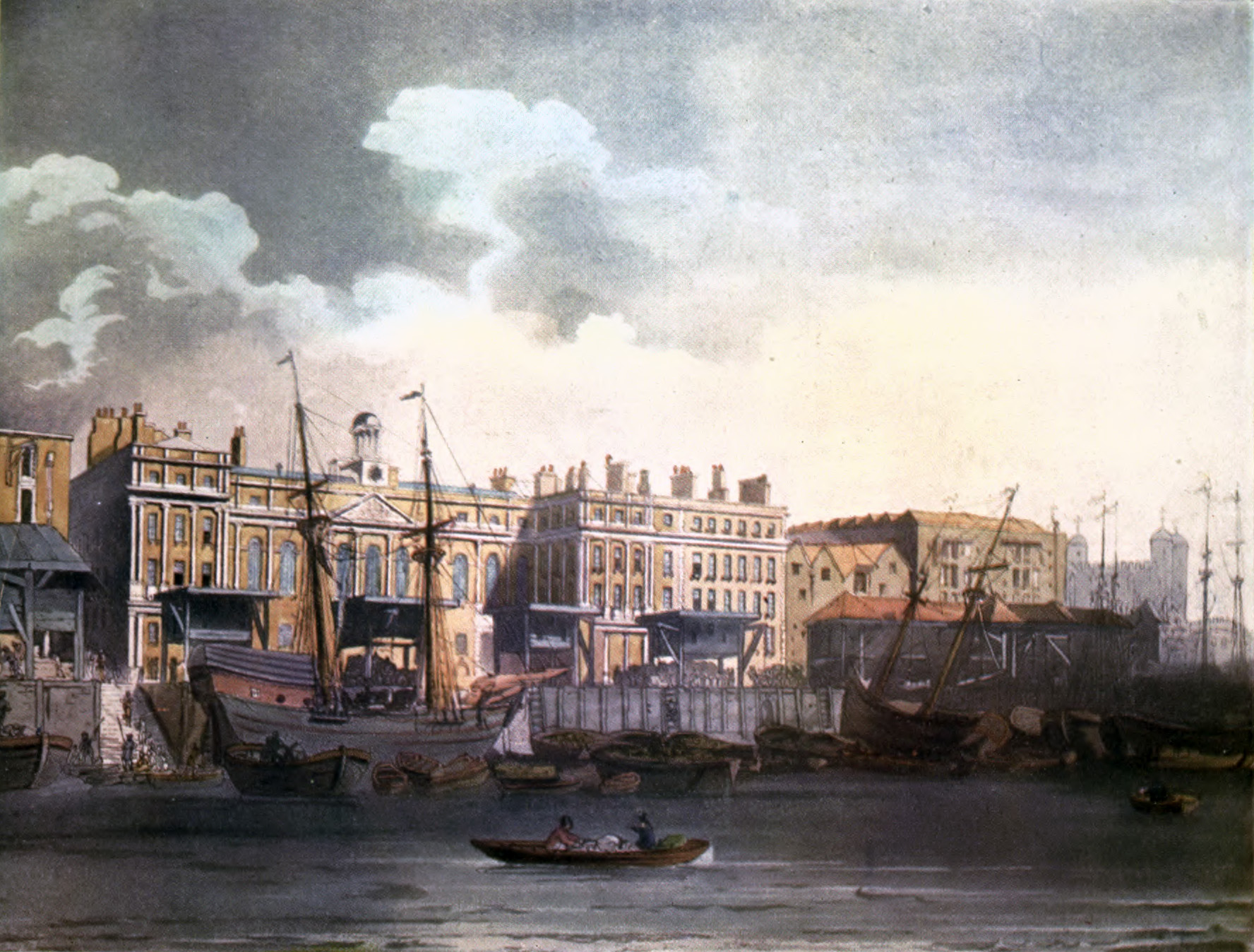
The Custom House as designed by Thomas Ripley

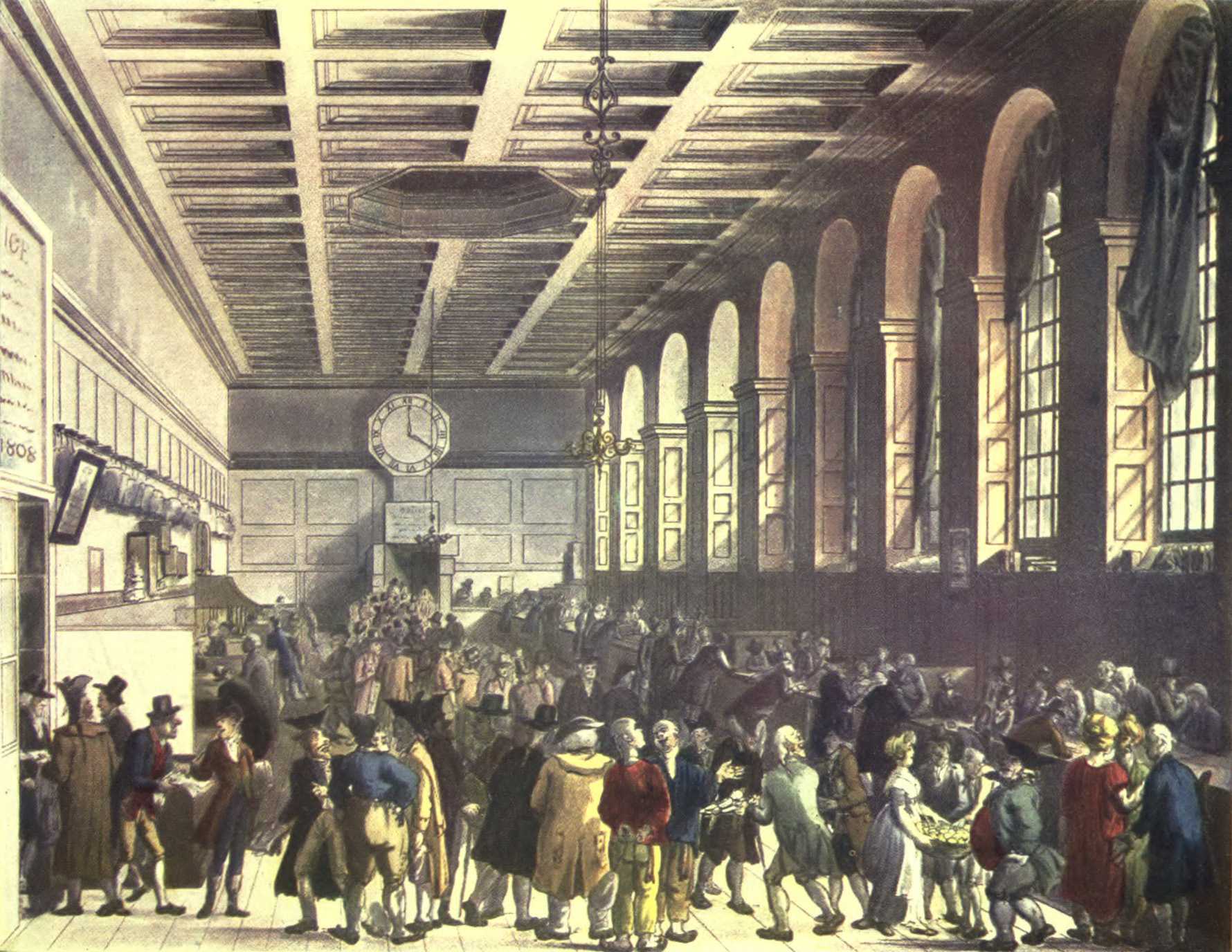
The Long Room in Ripley's Custom House c.1808

== Present building ==
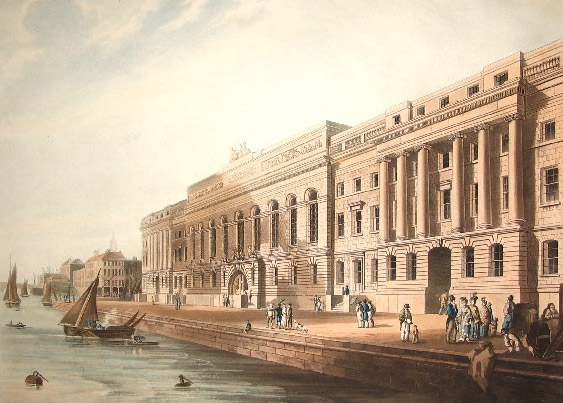
Laing's Custom House, completed in 1817, before the collapse and rebuilding of the central section in 1820

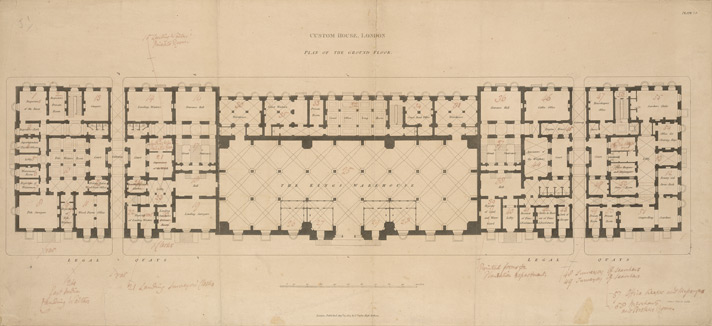
Ground floor plan, 1817

With the growth of trade, the opening of the docks, and the increases in duties during the Napoleonic wars, larger premises became necessary in the early nineteenth century. To meet this need, a new building to the designs of David Laing was begun in October 1813, on a site immediately to the west of Ripleys's building, where Bear Quay, Crown Quay, Dice Quay, and Horner's Quay had once been. Laing had held the position of surveyor to HM Customs since 1810. On 12 February 1814, the old building was destroyed by fire, resulting in the explosion of gunpowder and spirits. As a result, papers were retrieved from as far as Hackney Marshes.

The northern front of Laing's new building was plain, but the south front towards the river had wings with Ionic colonnades and a projecting centre section. The attic storey of the latter was decorated with terracotta figures in bas-relief by John Charles Felix Rossi and J. G. Bubb representing the arts and sciences, commerce and industry, and inhabitants of various countries of the world. A clock dial, nine feet in diameter, was supported by colossal figures symbolising Industry and Plenty, and the royal arms by figures of Ocean and Commerce. The riverfront was 488 feet 10 1/2 inches long, and the building cost £255,000.

As originally built, the interior contained warehouses, cellars, about 170 offices, and a "Long room", measuring, 190 by 66 feet. On the ground floor was the "Queen's warehouse", with a rib-vaulted ceiling. The cellars in the basement were fireproof and used to store wine and spirits seized by the customs.

=== Partial collapse ===
In 1825, the timber pilings which served as foundations for the custom house gave way, leading to a partial collapse of the building.

On investigation, it soon became clear that the building contractors Miles and Peto had grossly underestimated the cost of the work and had started to cut corners. The foundations were totally inadequate, even though the ground was known to be unstable. Mile and Peto had used beechwood piles in the foundations rather than the oak that had been specified to counter the alternate damp and dry, and where the original plans had required nine piles under the twelve piers supporting the Long Room, they had only provided four under some and three under others - with only two piles under two of the piers. The piles were also found to be too narrow and so crooked they were impossible to drive properly.

Further investigation showed:

- that instead of paying the one shilling per pile to the pile drivers as they had claimed, Miles and Peto had only paid 3 1/2d per pile,
- although Miles and Peto had invoiced for a total of 104,000 ft of piling, it was discovered that only 53,300 ft had actually been driven,
- although Miles and Peto had charged for certain arches as though they were solid brickwork, after investigation, they were found to have been filled with chalk lime and stone waste that would have cost little more than the labour of conveying it there,
- the south front steps were charged as if solid brickwork but were found to be filled with similar stone waste,
- stone paving had been charged as if it were 6 inches thick but was found to be only 4 1/2 inches,
- the roof boarding under the slates had been charged for as new and the best materials, but was found to be re-used old boarding.

The poor quality of some of the workmanship prompted questions in Parliament in 1825 with the Chancellor of the Exchequer declaring the most scandalous frauds had been practised. Miles and Peto were censured for neglect and poor workmanship that a good builder would carefully have avoided.

=== Rebuilding ===
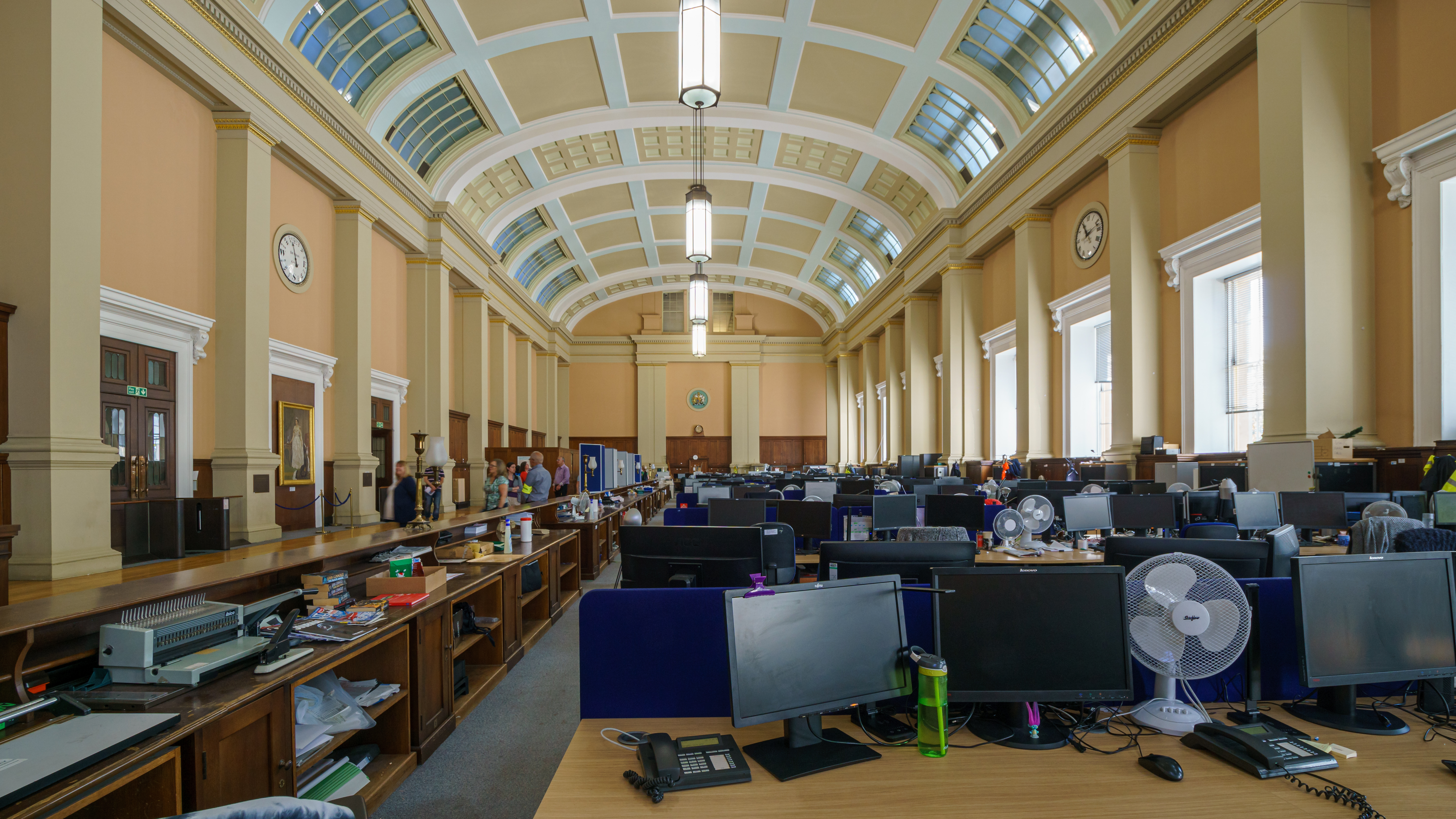
The Long Room

The central section was rebuilt on new foundations, with Ionic columns, to Robert Smirke’s design, at the cost of £180,000. Sculptural elements were by William Grinsell Nicholl and cost £80.

=== Second World War damage ===
During the Blitz, the east wing of the building was destroyed. In the early 1960s the wing was rebuilt in contemporary style behind a recreated historic façade.

== Hotel Proposals ==
In 2001, HMRC sold a 175 year lease on the building to Mapeley as part of a wider sale of HMRC assets. The sale included a 20 year agreement for HMRC to continue occupying the building, which expired in 2021. The government announced the proposed closure of the HMRC office in 2018. In 2020 proposals were published for the building's conversion into a hotel, but planning permission was refused in 2022. In 2023, the long lease on the building was purchased from Mapeley by Jastar Capital, who launched consultations for a revised luxury hotel conversion.

In September 2025, the development was approved by the City of London. The site will feature a redevelopment of the Thameside path, replacing the existing car-park with a public space roughly the size of 12 tennis courts (2,400sqm).
