= Thomas Ripley (architect) =

English architect

Thomas Ripley (1682 Yorkshire – 10 February 1758, London) was an English architect.

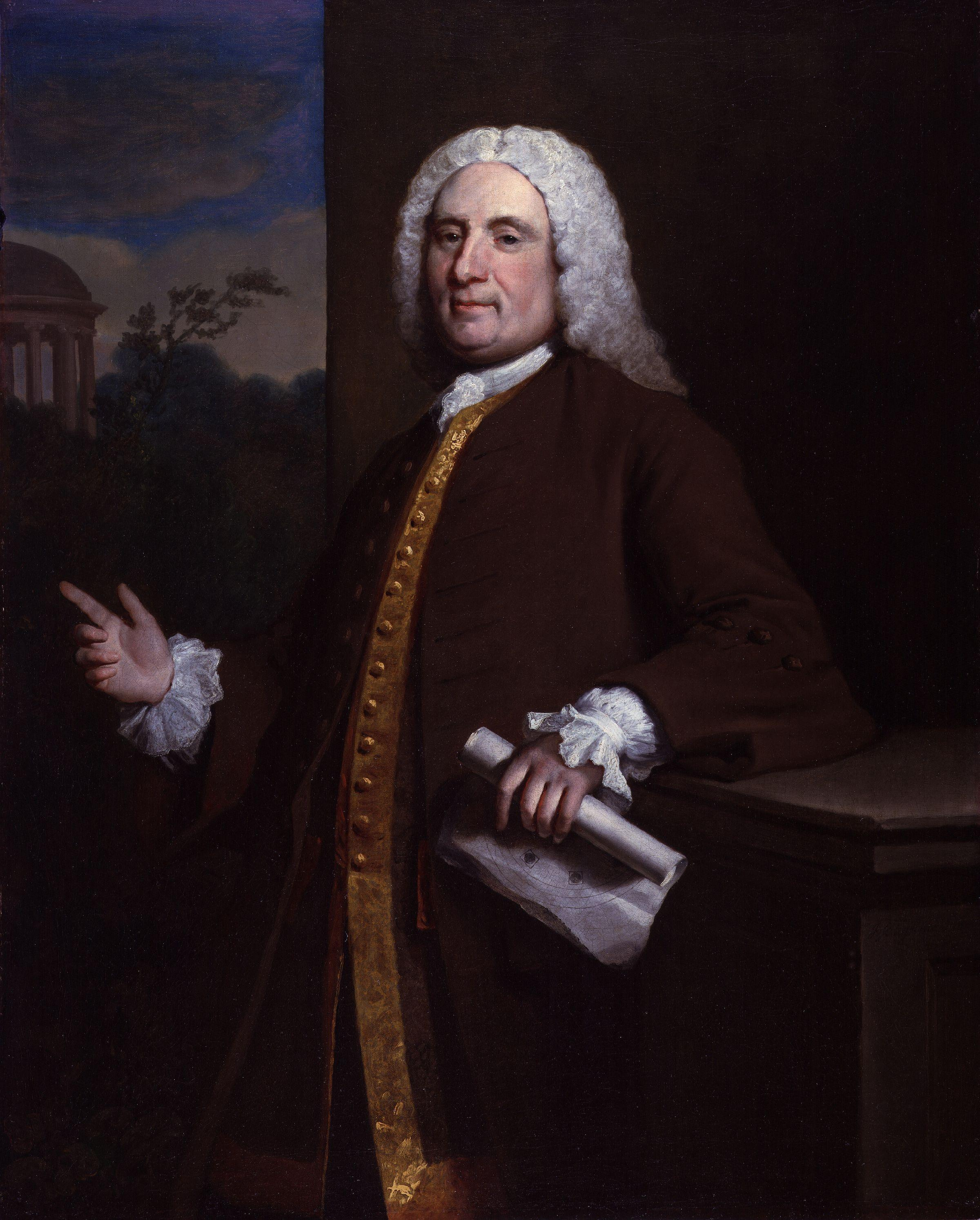
Thomas Ripley by Joseph Highmore

== Career ==
He first kept a coffee house in Wood Street, off Cheapside, London and in 1705 was admitted to the Carpenter's Company. An ex-carpenter, he rose by degrees to become an architect and Surveyor in the royal Office of Works. He was influenced by the Palladian style, but never lost his provincial manner, which earned the private derision of Sir John Vanbrugh and the public scorn of Alexander Pope.

His works include Houghton Hall for Sir Robert Walpole, which was first designed by the Palladian architects Colen Campbell and William Kent. These designs were greatly altered by Ripley.

His appointment in 1715 as Labourer in Trust at the Savoy marked the beginning of his continuous rise through the Office of the King's works. In 1721 he succeeded Grinling Gibbons as "Master Carpenter" and in 1726 he succeeded Vanbrugh as Comptroller of the King's Works, largely to the influence of Walpole. Walpole also engineered an additional appointment as Surveyor of Greenwich Hospital which was completed by him.

Buildings for the Office of Works included the Custom House (1718) and the Admiralty (1723–6), known as the Ripley Building, in London as well as the Queen Mary Block and chapel at Greenwich from 1729–1750. In 1739 he was collaborating with William Kent on designs for the New Houses of Parliament and between 1750–54 he made a great number of changes to Kent's designs for the Horse Guards.

His appointment as executant architect at Houghton was the first of a number of Walpole commissions. Here his responsibility for the applied portico and the opening of the colonnades to the garden on the west side demonstrated that he was more than a project manager. From 1725 he designed and built Wolterton Hall in Norfolk for Sir Robert's younger brother Horatio, the 1st Lord Walpole and was chiefly responsible for converting a formal park into a naturalised landscape. Until 1731 he was in charge of the major alterations at Raynham for the Townshend family.

Ripley was also involved in various speculative adventures, mainly in central London. In 1726 he was the original lessee of the west side of Grosvenor Square, and although his contribution there was limited to 16 Grosvenor Street he built a number of other houses in central London. Ripley was active in promoting the scheme to build Westminster Bridge and was also involved in Richard Holt's failed attempt to develop artificial stone. Nevertheless, he seems to have been an eager investor, being one of the few to make a fortune out of the South Sea Bubble.

Despite the dull and sometimes ill-proportioned character of his public buildings, his pragmatic approach and undoubted skill at managing large projects ensured that Greenwich was completed and fulfilled its function. Ripley always retained a craftsman's concern for practicality. At his masterpiece at Wolterton this resulted in a building of controlled austerity which demonstrated how convenience and dignity could be achieved through subtle planning. Wolterton's ground plan anticipates those of many villas of the 1750s.

== Personal life ==
On 17 November 1737 his first wife died and on 22 April 1742 he married Miss Bucknall of Hampton, Middlesex, an heiress said to be worth £40,000. Ripley died at his house in Old Scotland Yard on 10 February 1758, aged 75, leaving three sons and four daughters.

He was buried in Hampton, but no memorial survives. A portrait by Joseph Highmore is in the National Portrait Gallery and his Mastership of the Carpenter's Company (1742–3) is commemorated by a plaque at the Guildhall, London.

One of his sons moved into a house he had designed on Streatham Common now called Ripley House, at 10 Streatham Common South.

== Works ==
- Blatherwycke Hall, Northamptonshire, 1720
- Greenwich Hospital was completed by him
- Horse Guards
- Houghton Hall
- Old Admiralty, Whitehall, London, 1723-1726
- Ripley House, at 10 Streatham Common South, London
- Wolterton Hall, Norfolk, 1727-1741

Court offices
Preceded by John Vanbrugh	Comptroller of the King's Works; 1726 - 1758	Succeeded by Henry Flitcroft
