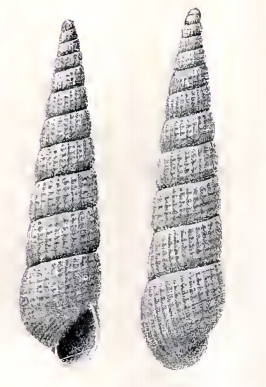
- Apertural and abapertural view of a shell of Turbonilla joubini

Scientific classification
- Kingdom: Animalia
- Phylum: Mollusca
- Class: Gastropoda
- Family: Pyramidellidae
- Genus: Turbonilla
- Species: T. joubini

Binomial name
- Turbonilla joubini Dautzenberg, 1912

= Turbonilla joubini =

Species of gastropod

Turbonilla joubini is a species of sea snail, a marine gastropod mollusk in the family Pyramidellidae, the pyrams and their allies.

This species was named for Professor Joubin.

== Distribution ==
This species occurs in the Atlantic Ocean off the estuary of the Congo River (Banana)
