= Marchioness of Exeter =

Marchioness of Exeter is a title normally given to the wife of the Marquess of Exeter. Those who have held the title include

- Gertrude Blount, Marchioness of Exeter (c.1504-1558)
- Isabella Cecil, Marchioness of Exeter (1803-1879)
- Elizabeth Hamilton, Duchess of Hamilton, later Marchioness of Exeter (1757-1837)
