= William Poyntz =

William Poyntz may refer to:

- William Stephen Poyntz, 19th-century English politician
- William Poyntz (high sheriff), 18th-century English High Sheriff of Berkshire
