= St Mary's Church, Stamford =

Coordinates: 52°39′04″N 00°28′41″W

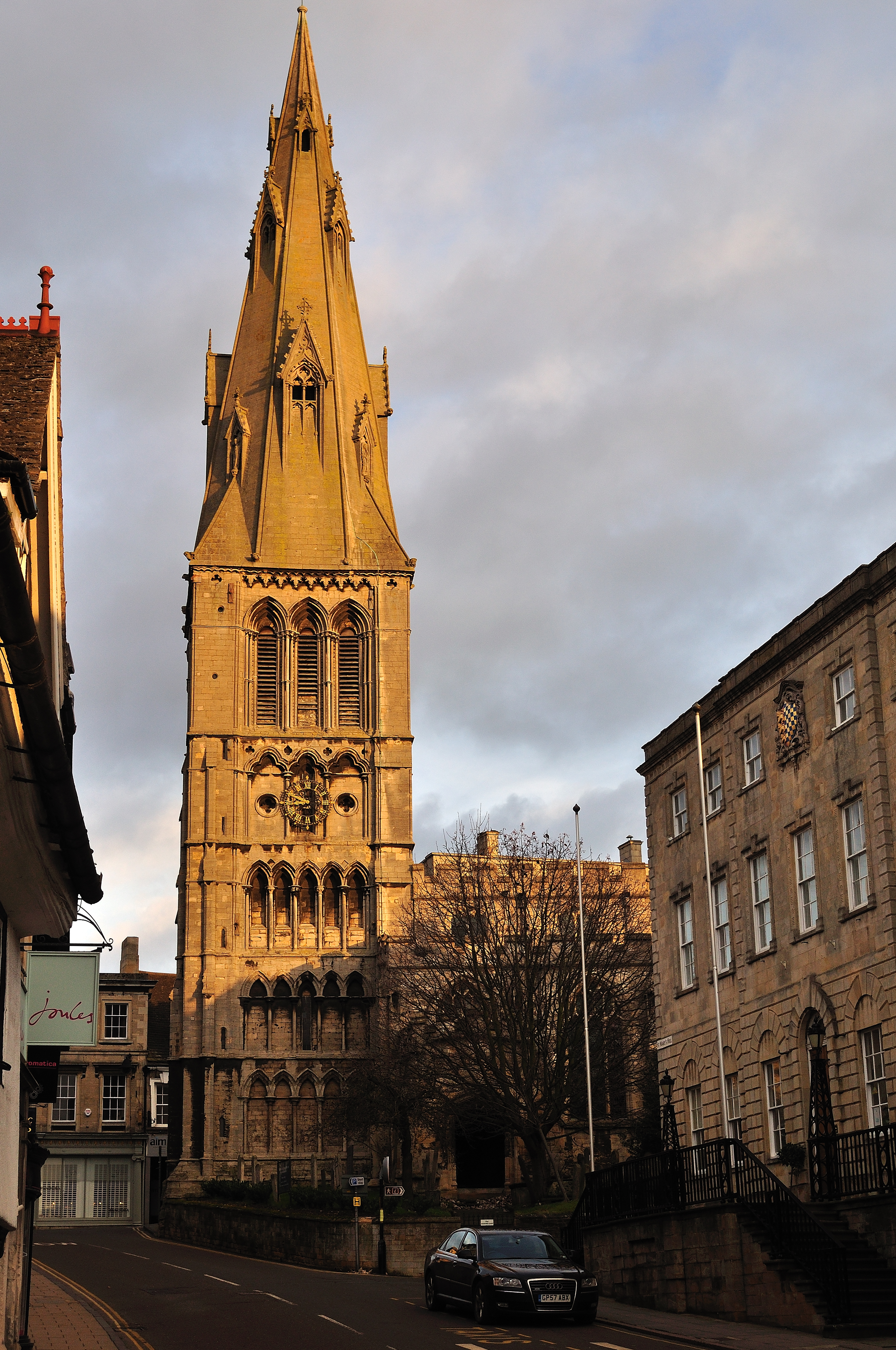
- St Mary's Church, view from St Mary's Hill
- St Mary's Church, Stamford
- Denomination: Church of England
- Churchmanship: Anglo Catholic
- Website: www.stamfordbenefice.com/

History
- Dedication: St Mary

Administration
- Province: Province of Canterbury
- Diocese: Diocese of Lincoln
- Archdeaconry: Archdeaconry of Boston
- Deanery: Stamford
- Parish: Stamford St Mary and St Michael

Clergy
- Bishop(s): The Rt Revd Norman Banks, Bishop of Richborough (AEO)
- Priest: Vacant

St Mary's Church, Stamford is a parish church of the Church of England, located in Stamford, Lincolnshire. It lends its name to St Mary's Hill (part of the old Great North Road) on which it stands, and which runs down to the river crossing opposite The George Hotel.

== History ==
The church was built in the 12th century, the tower in the 13th century, and the spire in the 14th century. The tower is 78 feet (24 metres) high, topped by a spire of 90 feet (27 metres), giving a total height of 168 feet (51 metres). The spire was saved from collapse following a recommendation by William Stukeley in 1741 that it should be repaired, work which was eventually carried out in 1788 by Charles Haynes, using iron strapping. The spire was strengthened again in 1913 by the addition of internal tie bars.

One of the glories of St Mary's is the 14th-century (part of its east wall is 2nd-phase 13th-century) Corpus Christi Chapel (North Chapel). It is the earliest part of the church and has connections with an educational foundation that later became Stamford School. The ceiling is one of the very few decorated medieval wagon vaults to survive in the East Midlands, although many can still be found in the West Country.

The vestry was added in 1880, with the screens and a new altar, as well as new decoration to the ceilings of the chancel and sanctuary, being completed in 1890 to designs by J. D. Sedding. In 1921, a rood was added atop the chancel screen in memory of those men of the parish who had died in the First World War. A commemorative plaque recording this event and the names of the men who died is placed south of the pulpit.

In 1948, a screen was fitted to the tower arch in memory of all those who had served in the Second World War.

=== Present day ===
The parish stands in the Anglo-Catholic tradition of the Church of England and receives alternative episcopal oversight from the Bishop of Richborough (currently Luke Irvine-Capel), as it rejects the ordination of women.

== Stained glass ==
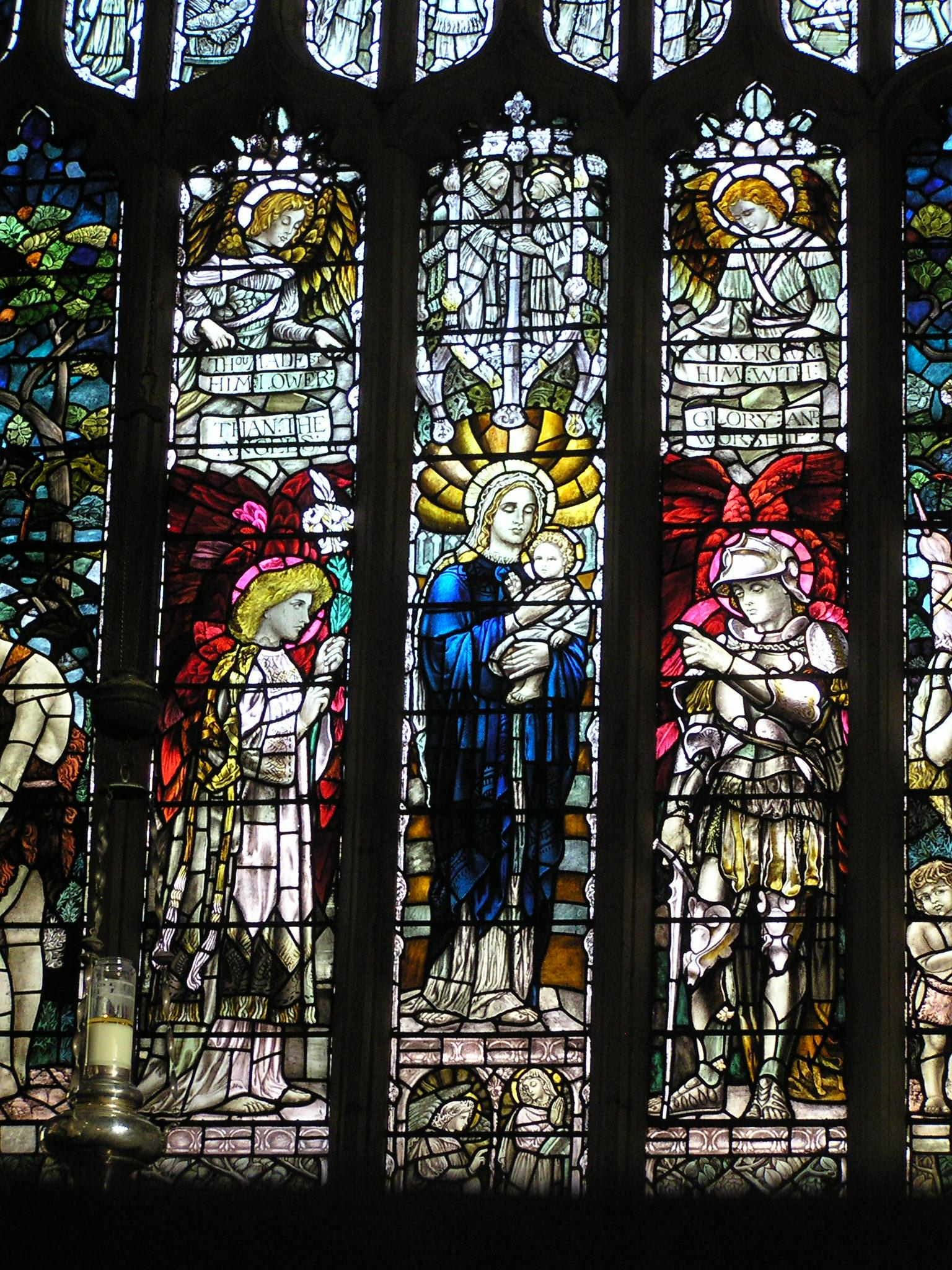
The Lady Chapel east window

Christopher Whall designed the Lady Chapel east window in 1891. This was Whall's first independent commission and was given to him by Sedding. Whall described the window as "the foundation and beginning of everything". Whall designed and made the window, with the help of one assistant, in a cowshed at Stonebridge, near Dorking in Surrey which he was using as a workshop. Meticulous preparation was said to have gone into producing the window, including the making of a suit of armour for the St Michael figure from papier-mâché - which his assistant had to wear. The window shows Adam and Eve in the outer main lights flanking Gabriel and St Michael with the Virgin & Child in the centre light. The tracery lights are based on the Mysteries of the Rosary. At the apex of the tracery is the Coronation of the Virgin. The firing and glazing were carried out by Britten & Gilson. In The Buildings of England: Lincolnshire, Nikolaus Pevsner and John Harris say of this window: "in a style derived from the Pre-Raphaelites but more hard edged and Impressionist".

There is a second window dating to 1893 in the North side of the Lady Chapel; this completed jointly with Louis Davis.

== Organ ==
The church has an organ dating from 1829 by Gray. Originally in a gallery at the west end, it was moved in 1852 to the end of the south aisle, site of the former Chapel of St Nicholas. A specification for the organ can be found on the National Pipe Organ Register. A fully electro-pneumatic action was added in 1984 by Richard Bower during an overhaul with tonal alterations. In most Oxford Movement churches, the organ speaks across the chancel. This was the case at St Mary's until 1984 when the great organ division was turned through 90 degrees so that the organ now speaks into the nave as well as across the chancel.

=== List of organists ===
- Richard Sharp until 1831
- Samuel Thomas Shearman 1831 - 1837
- Richard Layton ca. 1839 - 1874 (also organist of St Martin's Stamford)
- William Marriott from 1874
- George Thomas Patman ca. 1894 - 1896 (afterwards organist of All Saints' Church, Scarborough)
- Percy W. Taylor 1896 - 1898
- John Clare Billing 1898 - 1905 (formerly organist of St John's College, Lancashire)
- Mr. Booker from 1905
- John Clare Billing (also organist of St Martin's Church, Stamford, ???? - 1912) 1907 - 1918
- Herbert S. Staveley 1919 - 1928
- Fergus Fitzjohn Bryce 1928 - 1978 (formerly organist of St John the Baptist's Church, Barnack)
- Harold Harvey ca. 1985
- Nigel Stark from 2004

== Clock ==
A new clock by Potts of Leeds was obtained for a cost of £268 19s 10d. (equivalent to £29,545 in 2025). It included chimes on the quarters, and a strike on the hours. The clock was started by William Cecil, 3rd Marquess of Exeter on Saturday 8 November 1890.
