= Sarah Cecil, Countess of Exeter =

Second wife of Henry Cecil, Earl of Exeter

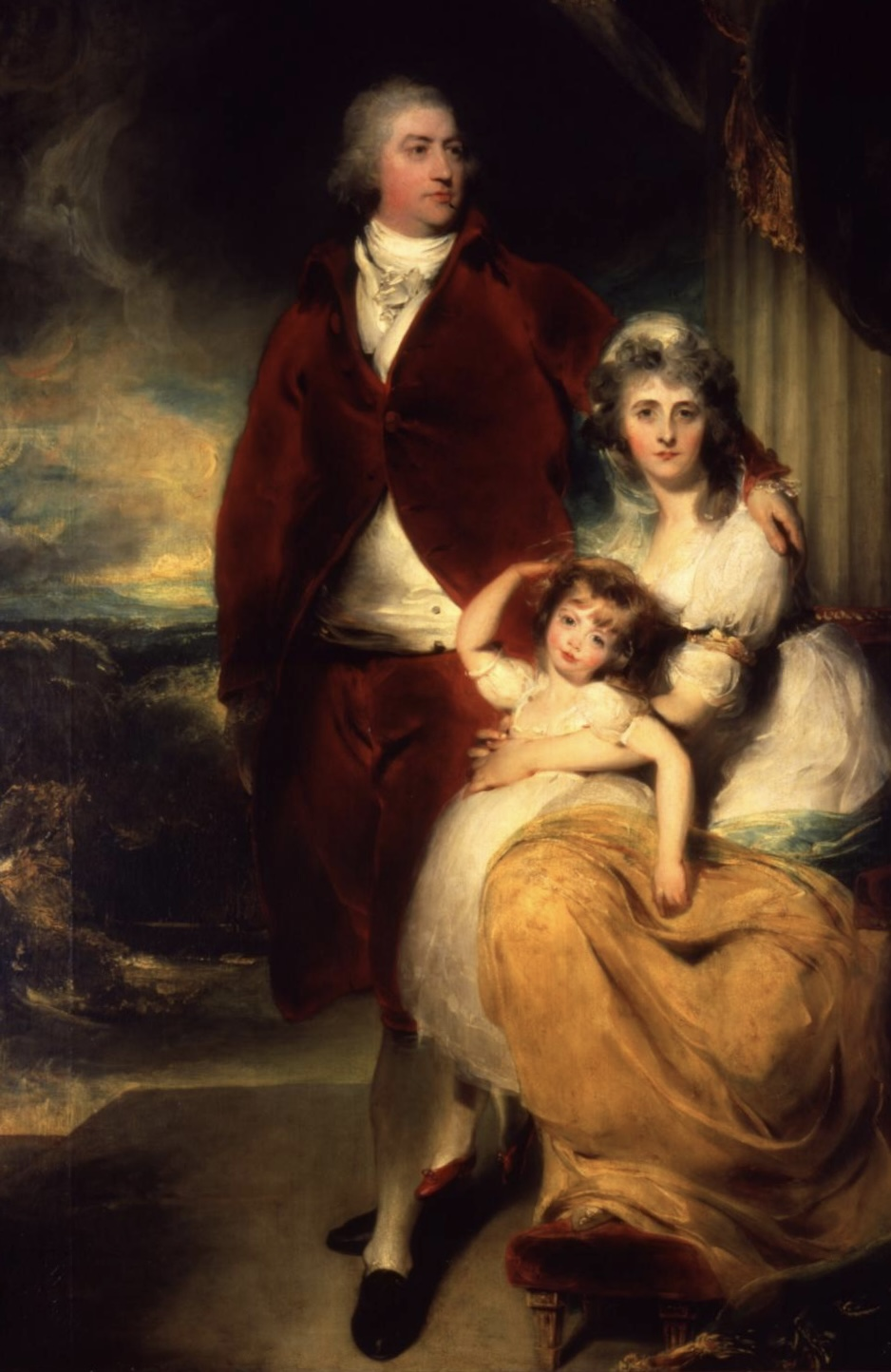
The Marquess of Exeter with his second wife, Sarah, and their daughter, Lady Sophia Cecil. By Thomas Lawrence

Sarah Cecil, Countess of Exeter (28 June 1773 – 18 January 1797), formerly Sarah Hoggins, was the second wife of Henry Cecil, Earl of Exeter.

Sarah Hoggins was the daughter of Thomas Hoggins, a farmer in the Shropshire village of Great Bolas, and his wife Jane. She was sixteen when she met Cecil, almost twenty years her senior, who lodged with the Hoggins family using the assumed name of John Jones following his separation from his first wife, Emma, who had eloped with a curate, Henry Sneyd. He subsequently bought a smallholding in the village and built a house, Bolas Villa.

In April 1790, Cecil bigamously married Sarah Hoggins. The following year he obtained a divorce by Act of Parliament, after which they went through a legal marriage ceremony on 3 October 1791 at St Mildred, Bread Street, London. Sarah became known as "the Cottage Countess".

They had four children:

- Lady Sophia Cecil (1792-1823), who married Rt. Hon. Henry Manvers Pierrepont and had one child
- Henry (1793), died in infancy
- Brownlow Cecil, 2nd Marquess of Exeter (1795-1867), who married Isabella Poyntz and had children
- Colonel Lord Thomas Cecil (1797-1873), who married Lady Sophia Georgiana Lennox, a daughter of the Duke of Richmond, and had no children

The future earl built Bolas House as a home for his new family.

In December 1793, Exeter inherited the Cecil estates from his uncle, moving to Burghley House with his new family. Sarah died shortly after the birth of her third son Thomas, aged only 23.

Sarah is referred to in Tennyson's poem "The Lord of Burleigh" (1835, published 1842); according to the poet, she did not know her husband's true identity until after he inherited Burghley House. The story was also re-told by Elisabeth Inglis-Jones in The Lord of Burghley.

In 1800, Exeter married for a third time, to Elizabeth, former Duchess of Hamilton, the ex-wife of the eighth Duke of Hamilton.
