= John Clare Billing =

John Clare Billing ARCO (1866–1955) was an organist, composer and writer based in England.

== Life ==
He was born in 1866 in Stamford, Lincolnshire, and claimed descent from the poet John Clare's family. Billing was educated at Stamford School. He studied organ with Haydn Keeton at Peterborough Cathedral and also James Edward Adkins.

He taught at the Bluecoat School in Stamford and became an authority on local history, writing "Jottings" in the Stamford Mercury.

== Appointments ==
- Organist of St Peter's Church, Southampton 1887 - 1890
- Organist of St John's College, Lancashire 1890 - 1898
- Organist of St Mary's Church, Stamford 1898 - 1905
- Organist of St Mary's Church, Ketton 1905 - 1907
- Organist of St Mary's Church, Stamford 1907 - 1918
- Organist of St Martin's Church, Stamford 1919 - 1927

== Compositions ==
He composed

- Slumber Song for Violin & Pianoforte
- Vestry Prayers
- Your dear Face (song)
- Round About Stamford
