= George Pattman =

Organist and composer based in England

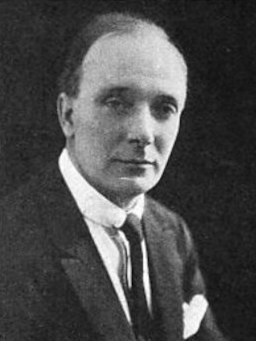
- Born: 1875; Grantham, Lincolnshire, England
- Died: 10 August 1961 (aged 85–86); Scarborough, North Yorkshire, England
- Occupation(s): Organist, composer

George Thomas Pattman, FRCO (1875 - 10 August 1961) was an organist and composer based in England.

== Life ==
He was born in 1875 in Grantham, and studied music under Haydn Keeton at Peterborough Cathedral.

On leaving Glasgow Cathedral in 1916 he toured the principal music halls for some years and afterwards made records and gave broadcasts. He toured the country with a portable touring organ built by Harrison and Harrison for many of his recitals.

He had a child with soprano singer, Minnie Rigby, who he had worked and collaborated with many times. Pattman had an affair with Minnie whilst she was married to Ernest Rigby, a Doctor of Music, who she had a son with, named Philip. Minnie divorced Ernest in 1922, before she had her second son.

George Pattman died in Scarborough on 10 August 1961.

== Appointments ==
- Organist of St Mary's Church, Stamford c. 1894
- Assistant organist of Peterborough Cathedral 1895–1896
- Organist of All Saints' Church, Scarborough 1896–1900
- Organist of All Saints' Church, Hessle 1900–1901
- Organist of Bridlington Priory 1901–1904
- Organist of St Mary's Cathedral, Glasgow 1904–1916
- Organist of Winter Gardens, Blackpool 1924-1925
- Organist of St Lawrence's Church, Canon's Park, Edgware c. 1941

== Compositions ==
He composed "Cinderella (Suite for Full Orchestra)".
