= Richard Layton (organist) =

British organist and composer (1815–1893)

- Born: 1815; Peterborough, Cambridgeshire, England
- Died: 21 March 1893 (aged 77–78); Stamford, Lincolnshire, England
- Organizations: Organist; composer

Richard Layton (1815 – 21 March 1893) was a British organist and composer based in Stamford, Lincolnshire.

== Biography ==
He was born in Peterborough in 1815, the son of Richard Layton (1786–1874), the Sexton of Peterborough Cathedral, and Martha Frisby. He was baptised on 26 March 1815.

Layton was a dealer in musical instruments based in Stamford, Lincolnshire.

He died on 21 March 1893 and left £633 15s (equivalent to £70,410 in 2025) to his wife, Eliza.

== Appointments ==
- Organist of St Martin's Church, Stamford, 1836 – c. 1876
- Organist of St Mary's Church, Stamford
- Organist of St George's Church, Stamford, c. 1878

== Works ==
- 1841: "Hark the Brazen Trumpet Sounds"
- 1843: "The Rosy Morn"
- "Star of Hope Polka"
- 1873: "Song of the Snow" (words by S. L. Moore)
- "Old Lindum Polka"
