= Ernest John Harrison =

British writer

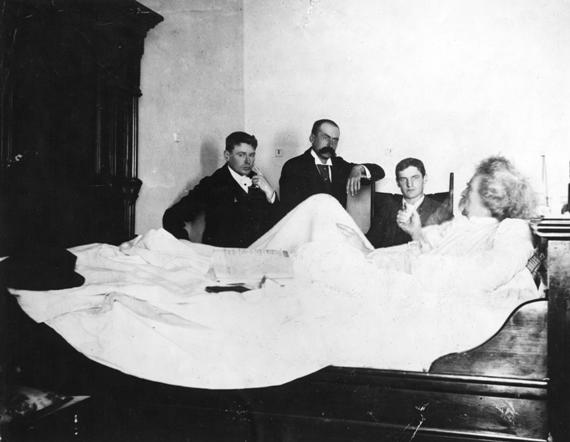
Ernest John Harrison (sitting first on the right) and other reporters interviewing Mark Twain from his hotel bed in Vancouver on 18 August 1895

Ernest John ("E.J.") Harrison (22 August 1873 - 23 April 1961) was an English journalist, author and judoka. Harrison was born in Manchester, England, on 22 August 1873. He wrote many books about the practice of judo. He died in London, on 23 April 1961.

He was the younger of two boys born to Mary Ann (Polly) Harrison formerly Phillips. Following the death of their father, Ernest and his brother Paul, lived with their uncle Richard Cobden Phillips and his children, Mahomet and Nene, who recently returned from the Congo, where R. C. Phillips had been an agent for a trading company. Phillips in Africa had met Henry Morton Stanley in 1876. An uncle, John Searle Ragland Phillips, later became editor of The Yorkshire Post. Ernest’s cousin Mahomet Thomas Phillips became an accomplished ecclesiastical sculptor and carver, with work residing in numerous churches and cathedrals in the UK and abroad and worked on a number of war memorials following the First World War.

As a young man, Harrison was a journalist who worked for newspapers in England, British Columbia, and Japan. He enjoyed wrestling. In 1897, while working for Yokohama newspaper called Japan Herald, he began training in Tenjin shinyo-ryu jujutsu. After moving to Tokyo, he began training in Kodokan judo. In 1911, he was the first foreign-born person to achieve shodan (black belt ranking) in Kodokan judo. In 1912, his Fighting Spirit of Japan was among the first English-language books to describe the Japanese martial arts from the perspective of a foreign-born practitioner of those arts.

In 1917, Harrison was commissioned as a second lieutenant in the Labour Corps of the British Army but later transferred to Military Intelligence. He served until 1919. Countries he served in included China, France, Latvia, and Estonia. In 1921, Harrison left Lithuania to London and started to work as official press attaché and ELTA correspondent in the Lithuanian legation to the United Kingdom. Most of his professional writings from 1921 to 1940 focused on Lithuanian topics. After work, he often participated in the activities of a London judo club called the Budokwai. During the Second World War, Harrison was a censor in Russian, Lithuanian, and Polish languages for the British Post Office. After the war, he wrote and translated judo and Lithuanian books.

Harrison was married twice. His first wife was Cicely Ross, an Australian woman he had met in Japan and sister of reputable judoka Arthur John (Jack) Ross. He and his second wife, Rene, had one daughter, Aldona.

== Books ==
- Peace or War East of Baikal? (1910). Yokohama: Kelly & Walsh.
- The Fighting Spirit of Japan and Other Studies. (1912). New York: C. Scribner's Sons; London: T. Fisher Unwin; Yokohama (1913): Kelly & Walsh.
- Lithuania Past and Present. (1922). London: T. Fisher Unwin.
- The Red Camarilla. A Stirring Romance of Present-day Russia". (1923). London: G. Allen & Unwin.
- Rasprava: Plot and counterplot in Soviet Russia (1924). London: Geoffrey J. Bles.
- Lithuania: A Review. (1926). London: Eyre & Spottiswoode.
- Lithuania, 1928. (1928). London: Hazell, Watson & Viney.
- Theory & Practice of Judo, etc. (reprinted from Nichi-ei Shinshi). Reading, no publisher listed.
- Art of Ju-Jitsu. (1932). London: W. Foulsham.
- Wrestling: Catch-as-catch-can, Cumberland & Westmorland, & All-in Styles. (1934). London: Foulsham's Sports Library.
- Lithuania's Fight for Freedom. With Bronius Kazys Balutis (1944). London: "The Federation of the Lithuanian Societies in Great Britain".
- Judo, etc. (1950). London: W. G. Foyle.
- The Manual of Judo, etc. (1952). London: W. Foulsham.
- Judo for Beginners... Illustrated. (1953) London: W. Foulsham.
- Judo on the Ground: The Oda (9th Dan) Method, "Katamewaza". (1954). London: W. Foulsham.
- The Fighting Spirit of Japan. (1955). London: W. Foulsham.
- Judo for Women... Illustrated. (1957). London: W. Foulsham.
- Junior Judo. (1957). London: W. Foulsham.
- Physical Training for Men. (1957). London: W. Foulsham.
- Physical Training for Women. (1957). London: W. Foulsham.
- The Manual of Karate. (1959). London: W. Foulsham. (Rev. ed., 1974)
- Judo, the Art of Jujutsu, etc. (1960). London: W. Foulsham.
- Judo for Young Girls. (1961). London: W. Foulsham.

== Translations ==
- Vilenkin, Grigory. (1908). The Political and Economic Organization of Modern Japan. Tokyo: Kondo Shoten.
- Kawaishi, Mikonosuke. (1955). My Method of Judo. London: W. Foulsham.
- Aida, Hikoichi. (1956). Kodokan Judo. London: W. Foulsham.
- Garbauskas, A. (1958). Know Thyself. A Theory of the Spirit and a System of Man's Psychical Powers. Nottingham: The Author.
- Šapoka, Adolfas. (issued in 1962). Vilnius in the life of Lithuania. Edited by C.R. Jurgėla and S. Sužiedėlis. Toronto: Lithuanian Association of the Vilnius Region in Toronto.
- Lukša-Daumantas, Juozas (issued in 1975 and 1988) Fighters for freedom. Lithuanian partisans versus the U.S.S.R. (1944-1947). Toronto: Manyland Books.
