= Thomas Goodrich (cricketer) =

English cricketer

Personal information
- Full name: Thomas Cooper Goodrich
- Born: c. 1823; Stamford, Lincolnshire, England
- Died: 10 March 1885 (aged 61/62); Stamford, Lincolnshire, England
- Batting: Unknown
- Bowling: Unknown

Career statistics
Competition	First-class
Matches	2
Runs scored	27
Batting average	9.00
100s/50s	–/–
Top score	16
Balls bowled	124
Wickets	16
Bowling average	11.85
5 wickets in innings	2
10 wickets in match	–
Best bowling	7/83
Catches/stumpings	1/–
- Source: Cricinfo, 2 August 2019

Thomas Cooper Goodrich (c. 1823 – 10 March 1885) was an English first-class cricketer.

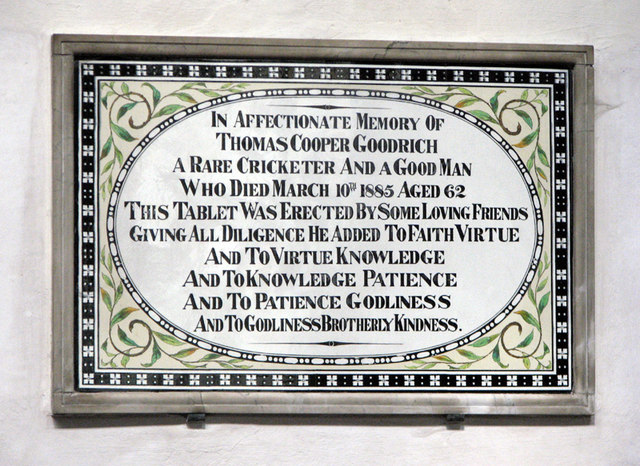
Memorial in St Martin's Church, Stamford

Goodrich was born in 1823 at Stamford, Lincolnshire. He later made two appearances in first-class cricket. His first appearance came for the Gentlemen of England against the Gentlemen of Marylebone Cricket Club at Lord's in 1853. Goodrich took five wickets in the Gentlemen of Marylebone Cricket Club first-innings, before following that up with four wickets in their second-innings. Eight years later, he made his second first-class appearance for the Gentlemen of the North against the Gentlemen of the South at Nottingham. He took his second first-class five wicket haul in the Gentlemen of the South first-innings, taking figures of 7 for 83. Across both matches he also scored a total of 27 runs. He died in March 1885 at Stamford.
