= Mahomet Thomas Phillips =

Congolese-English sculptor

- Born: 1 June 1876; Banana, Congo
- Died: 7 June 1943 (aged 67); Stamford, Lincolnshire
- Burial place: Stamford Cemetery
- Occupations: Sculptor, stone carver and artist
- Employer(s): Bowman & Sons, Stamford
- Notable work: Reredos - Cathedral of St John the Baptist in St John's, Canada; Memorial to Edith Cavell - Peterborough Cathedral; Font Cover - Southwark Cathedral

Mahomet Thomas Phillips (1 June 1876 – 7 June 1943) was an English-Congolese sculptor and stone carver. His work features in cathedrals and churches in England and beyond, including in a memorial to Edith Cavell in Peterborough Cathedral, and a reredos for the Cathedral of St John the Baptist in St John's, Newfoundland in Canada. He worked with a number of well known architects including Temple Moore, Sir Giles Gilbert Scott and Sir Charles Nicholson.

== Biography ==
Phillips was born on 1 June 1876 in Banana, Congo, and was the third child of an English trader named Richard Cobden Phillips and Nené Bassa also known as Menina Barros, a black woman from Cabinda. Both he and his brother were educated at a mission school in Mukinvika. Sometime in the 1880s Mahomet and his younger sister Nene travelled to England. In 1891 Mahomet was living in Salford with his father and his two cousins Paul and Ernest John Harrison.

From 1896 to 1909 Phillips studied and worked under George Walker Milburn at the York School of Science & Art. He passed his first exams there in 1896. In 1905 he was awarded a second class in 'drawing from the Antique'. During this time he met his wife Mary Ann Morley; they went on to have three children - Nene (1900), Lancelot Barros (1902) and Francisco Morley (1904).

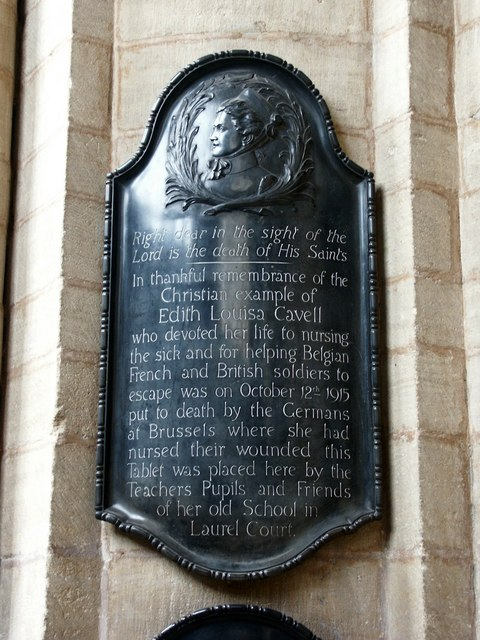
Memorial to Edith Cavell in Peterborough Cathedral

In 1911 Phillips and his family moved to Tottenham. In 1913 a roodscreen by him was unveiled at St Chad's in Dunholme, Lincolnshire. By 1916 the family were living in Peterborough, where he worked for the builder and stonemason J. Thompson & Sons. Whilst there he worked on the memorial designed by Temple Moore to Edith Cavell in Peterborough Cathedral. In 1916 he was conscripted into the British Army. He applied to a Military Service Tribunal, possibly because he was close to the upper age limit, and was given a short deferral; he was described in the Peterborough Express as a "sculptor in wood, stone and marble".

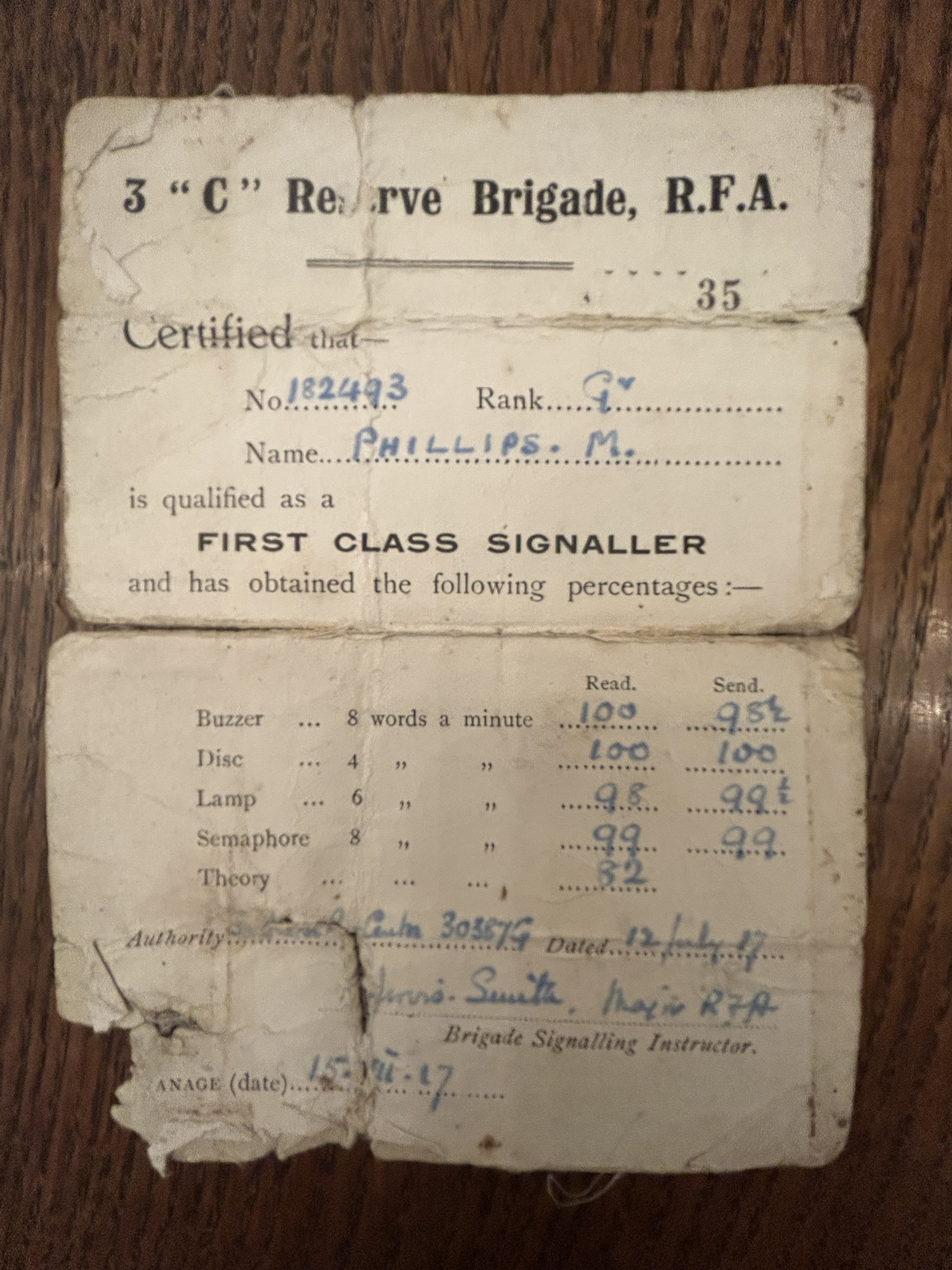
Signallers Certificate

He eventually enlisted in the Royal Field Artillery, attaining the rank of corporal. Phillips also undertook signalling training and on 15 July 1917 he qualified as a 'First Class Signaller'.

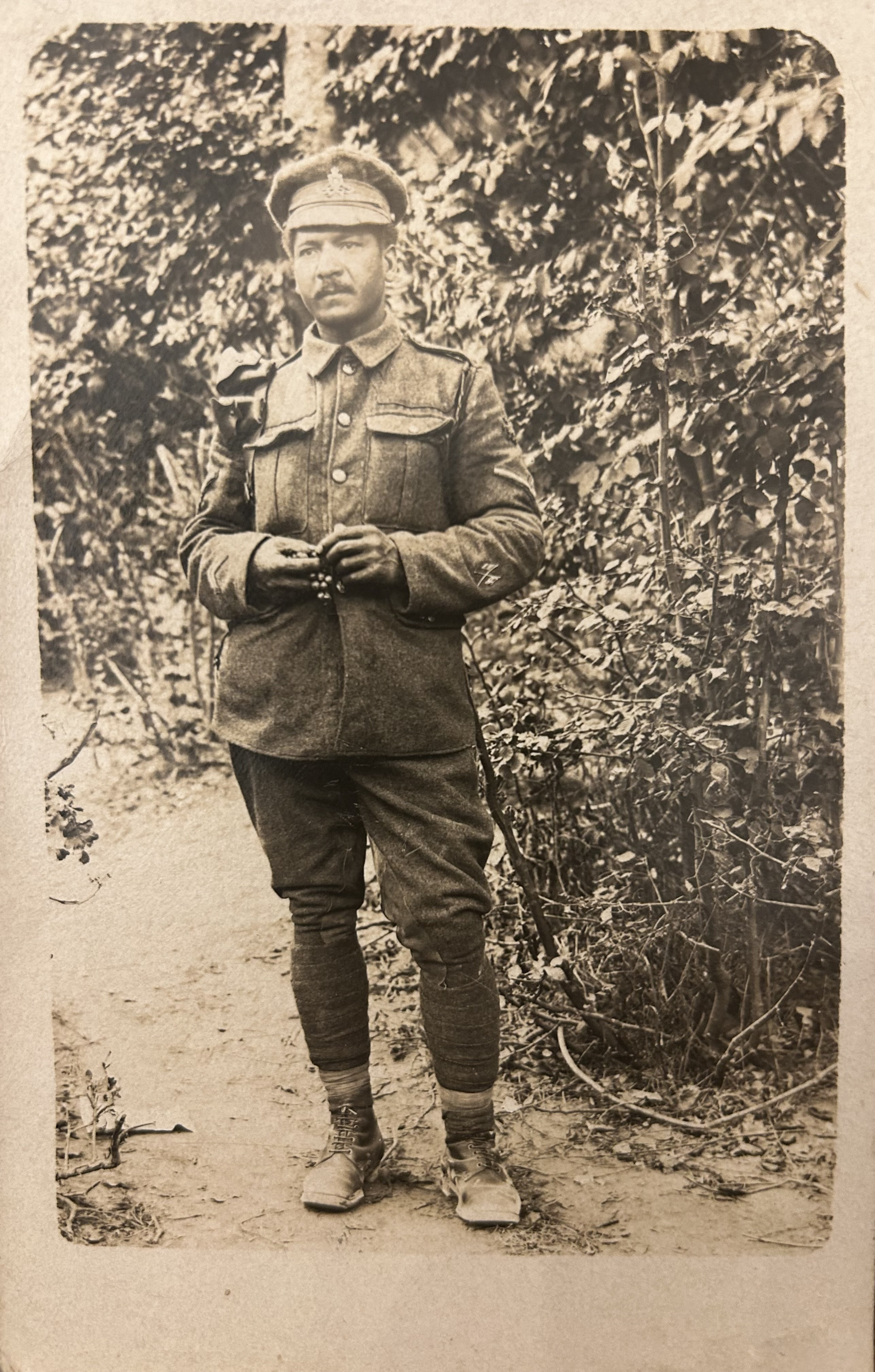
Mahomet in the uniform of the Royal Field Artillery with signallers badge on left forearm.

After the First World War, Phillips returned to his work as a sculptor; one of his first commissions was the war memorial in Sleaford, Lincolnshire, which was unveiled in 1922. He also worked on Hereford War Memorial in the same year. In 1923 he carved several grotesques including a falcon and a unicorn for St George's Chapel, Windsor Castle. The same year he and his son Lancelot, completed a reredos for the Cathedral of St John the Baptist in St John's in Newfoundland. It took them 2,779 hours to create.

From the 1920s he worked for Bowman & Sons in Stamford. In 1920 he worked with them on the Grantham War Memorial in St Wulfram's churchyard. He became head of sculpting at Bowman & Sons and is credited with works in the cathedrals of Bradford, Chelmsford, Southwark, Manchester and Peterborough. In 1925 he worked on a memorial at Silverdale, Lancashire, to Helen Currer Briggs, a former Lady Mayoress of Leeds, who instigated Leeds Poor Children's Holiday Camp Association. In 1926 Phillips designed and carved the new screen in St Martin's Church, Stamford.

Phillips died on 7 June 1943 and is buried with his wife Mary in Stamford Cemetery.

== Legacy ==
After his death, a George and the dragon carving by him was incorporated in the Second World War memorial unveiled in St George's Church, Stamford in 1949.

In October 2022 the University of Lincoln unveiled an exhibition in the University Library dedicated to Phillips' life.

== Gallery of works ==
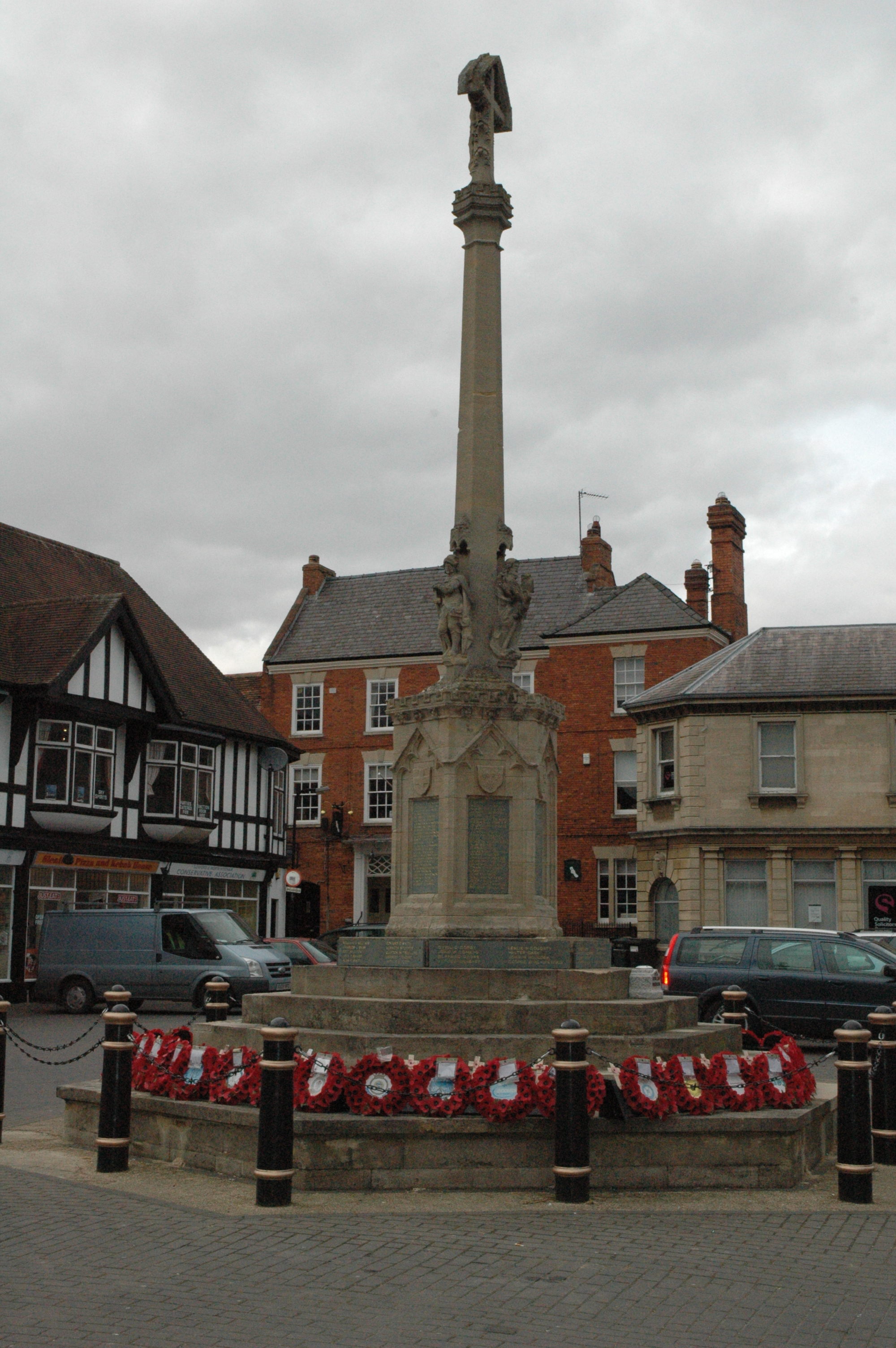
Sleaford War Memorial

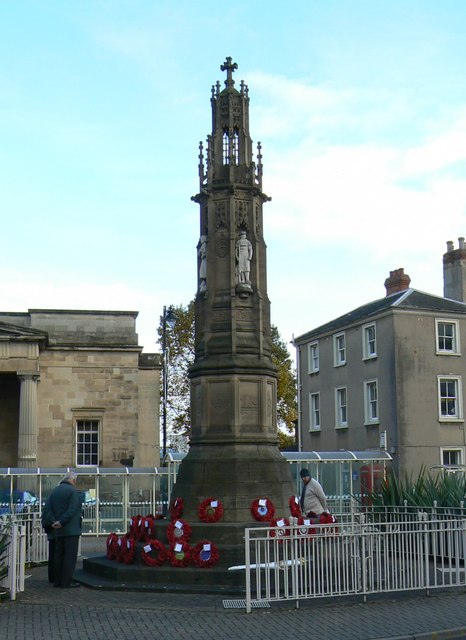
Hereford War Memorial

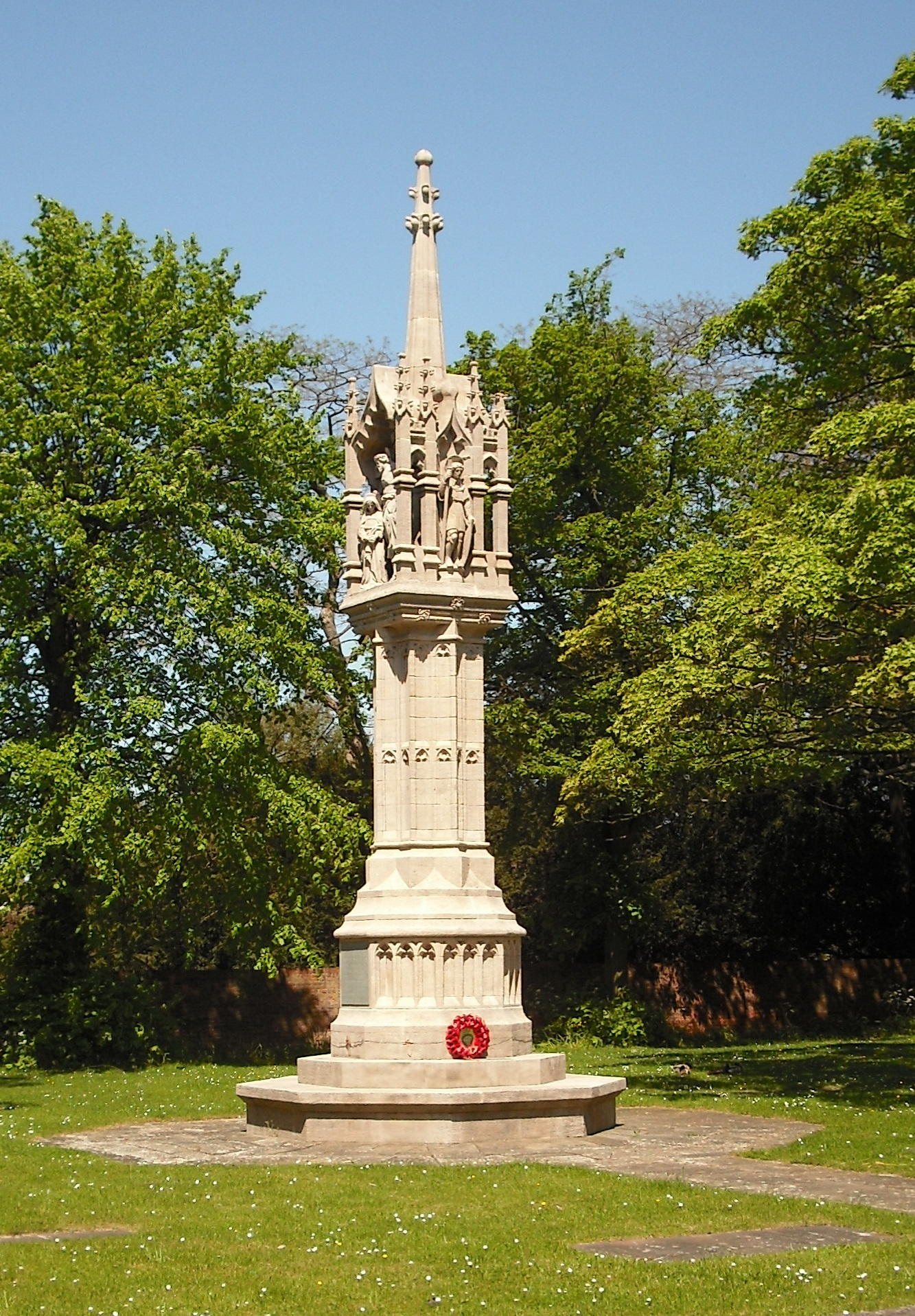
Grantham War Memorial

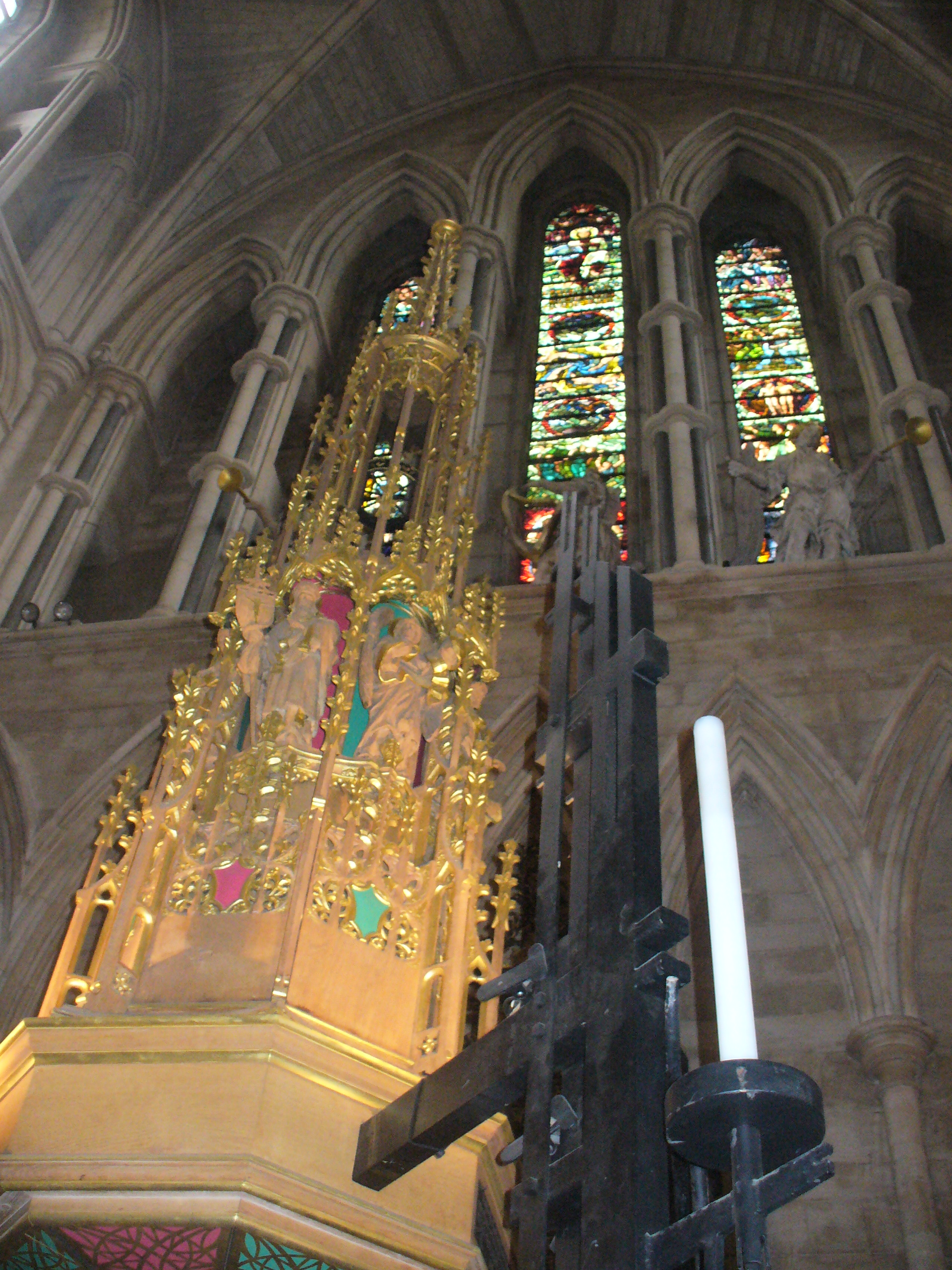
Font cover, Southwark Cathedral

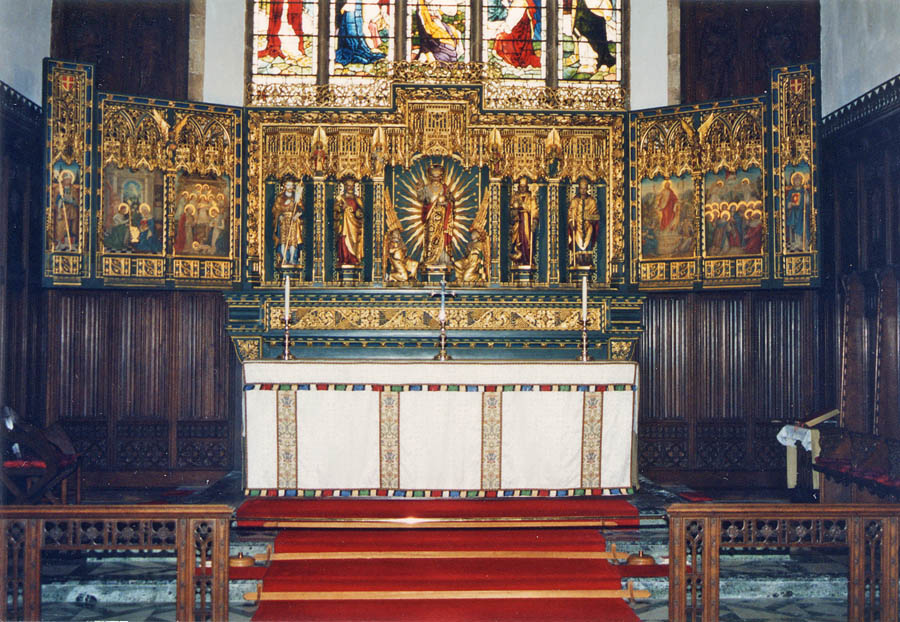
St John the Baptist Church, Peterborough - Sanctuary (showing reredos)

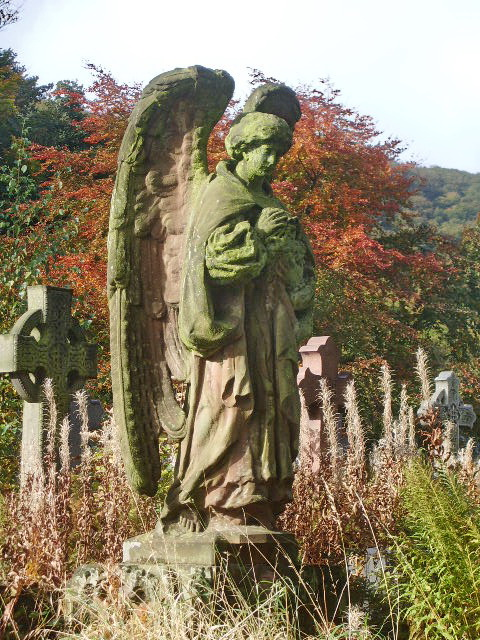
Grave at Christ Church, Todmorden

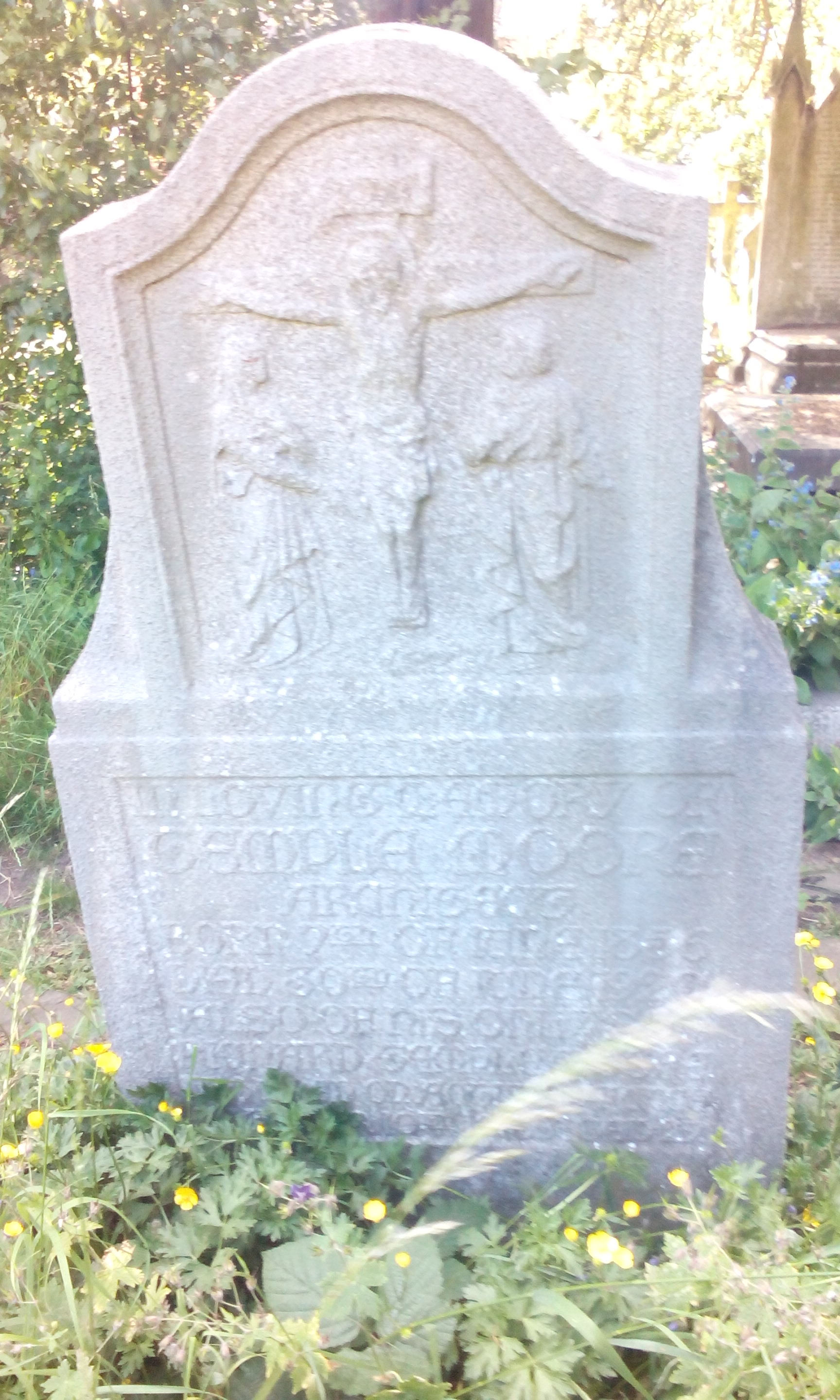
Headstone of Temple Moore at St John-at-Hampstead
