= Brownlow Cecil, 2nd Marquess of Exeter =

British peer, courtier, and Tory politician (1795–1867)

The Most Honourable The Marquess of Exeter KG PC
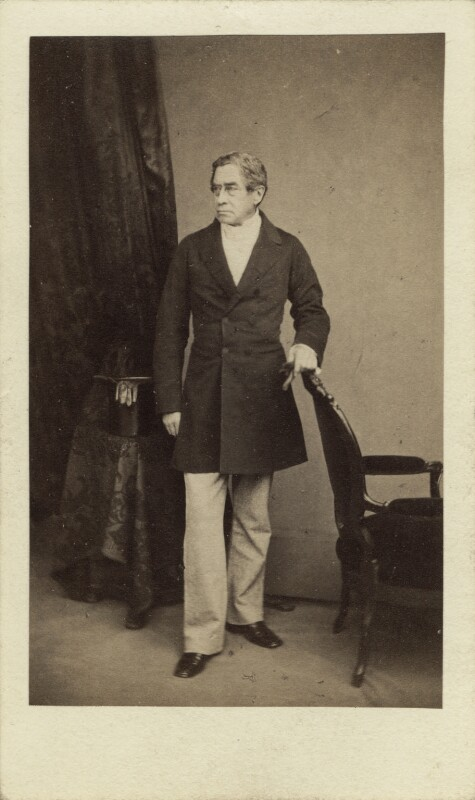
- Brownlow Cecil, 2nd Marquess of Exeter

Lord Chamberlain of the Household
- In office 27 February 1852 – 17 December 1852
- Monarch: Queen Victoria
- Prime Minister: The Earl of Derby
- Preceded by: The Marquess of Breadalbane
- Succeeded by: The Marquess of Breadalbane

Lord Steward of the Household
- In office 26 February 1858 – 11 June 1859
- Monarch: Queen Victoria
- Prime Minister: The Earl of Derby
- Preceded by: The Earl of St Germans
- Succeeded by: The Earl of St Germans

Personal details
- Born: 2 July 1795
- Died: 16 January 1867 (aged 71)
- Party: Tory
- Spouse: Isabella Poyntz (m. 1824)
- Education: St John's College, Cambridge

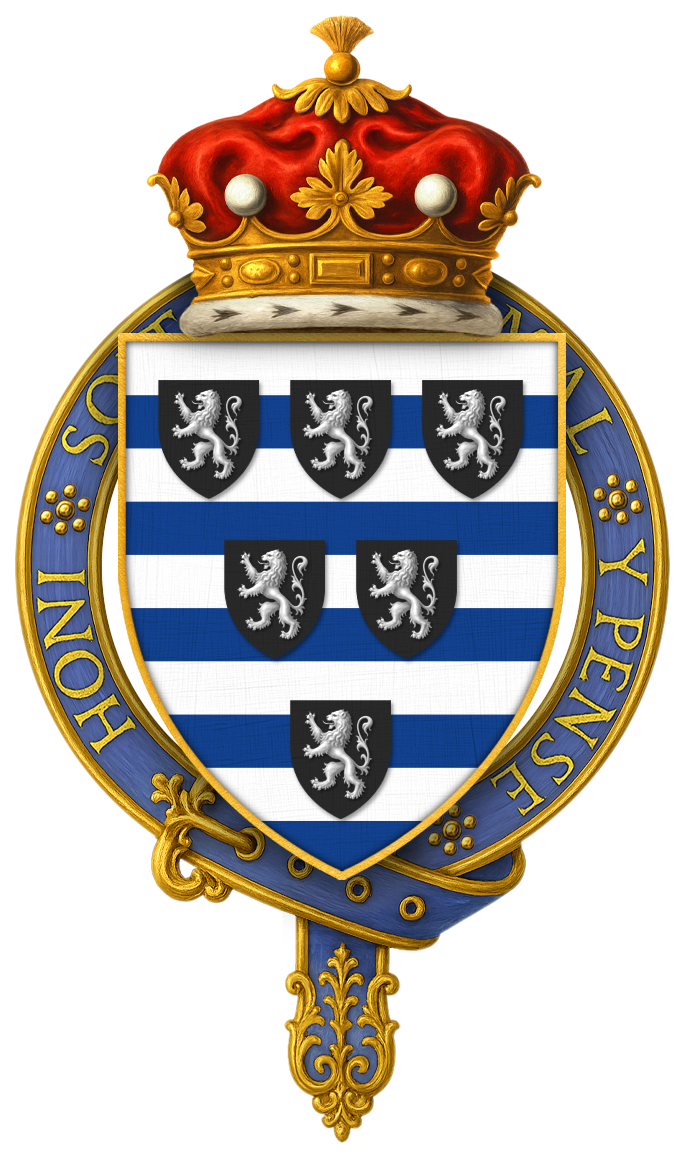
Garter-encircled arms of Brownlow Cecil, 2nd Marquess of Exeter, KG, PC

Brownlow Cecil, 2nd Marquess of Exeter (2 July 1795 – 16 January 1867), styled Lord Burghley until 1804, was a British peer, courtier, and Tory politician. He held office under the Earl of Derby as Lord Chamberlain of the Household in 1852 and as Lord Steward of the Household between 1858 and 1859.

== Background ==
Exeter was the eldest son of Henry Cecil, 1st Marquess of Exeter, and his second wife Sarah, daughter of Thomas Hoggins. His mother died shortly before his second birthday and in 1804 he succeeded to the marquessate, aged eight, on the death of his father.

A keen cricketer who was associated with Marylebone Cricket Club (MCC), prior to his political career he appeared in a match in 1817 for W. Ward's XI against E. H. Budd's XI at Lord's. He made scores of 1 and 4 not out in the match.

== Political career ==
Exeter held office in the first two Tory administrations of the Earl of Derby, first as Lord Chamberlain of the Household between February and December 1852, and later as Lord Steward of the Household from 1858 to 1859. Apart from his political career, he was also Lord Lieutenant of Rutland between 1826 and 1867 and of Northamptonshire between 1842 and 1867, and Groom of the Stole to the Prince Consort between 1841 and 1846. He was made a Knight of the Garter in 1827 and admitted to the Privy Council in 1841.

== Family ==
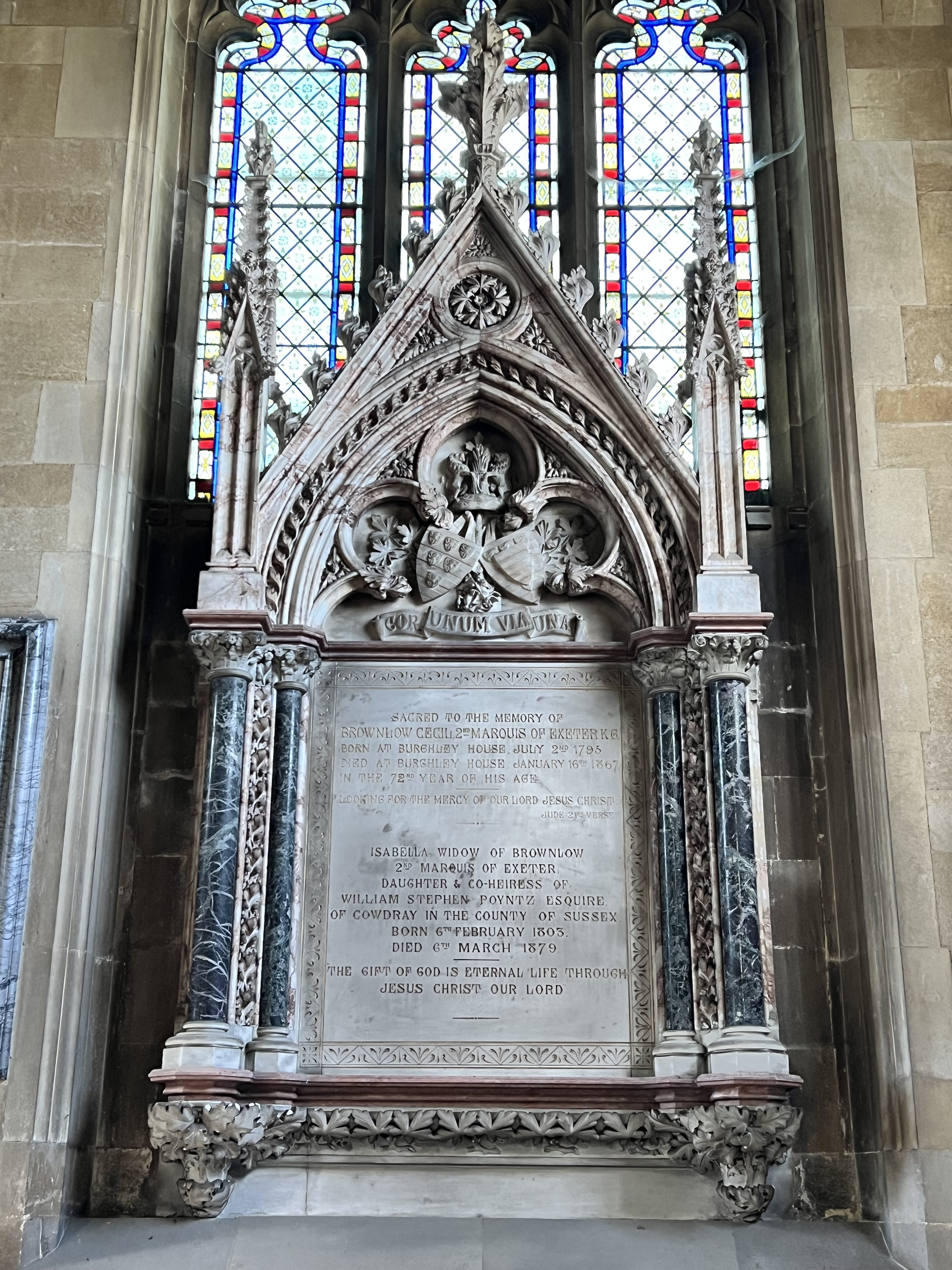
Memorial in St Martin's Church, Stamford

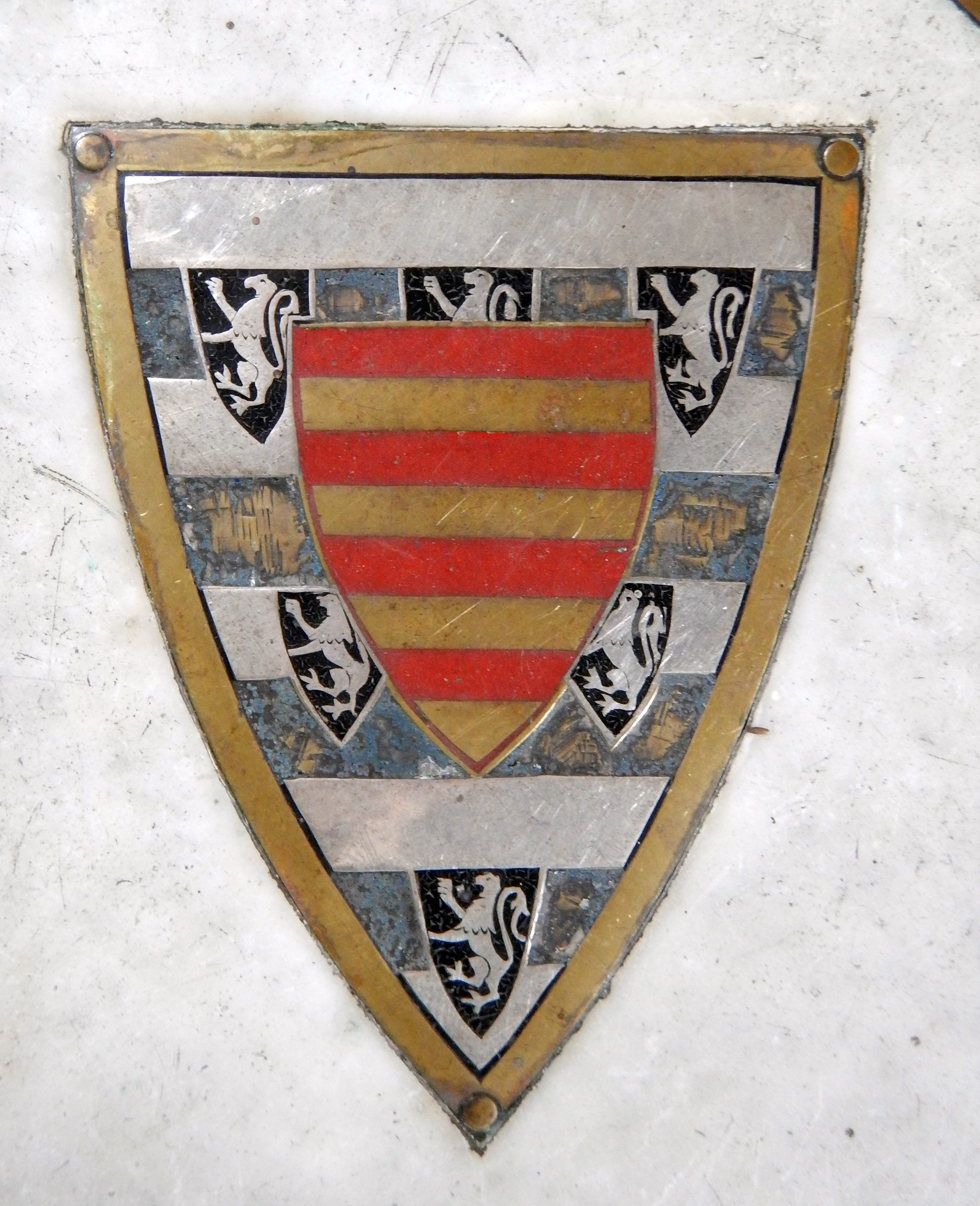
Arms of Cecil with inescutcheon of pretence of Poyntz, St Martin's Church, Stamford

Lord Exeter married Isabella Poyntz, one of the two daughters and co-heiresses of William Stephen Poyntz, on 12 May 1824. They had seven children:

- William Alleyne Cecil, 3rd Marquess of Exeter (1825–1895)
- Colonel Lord Brownlow Thomas Montague Cecil (1827–1905)
- Lady Mary Frances Cecil (1832–1917), married Dudley Ryder, 3rd Earl of Harrowby
- Commander Lord Edward Henry Cecil (1834–1862)
- Lord Henry Poyntz Cecil (1837–1858)
- Lord Adelbert Percy Cecil (1841–1889), member of the Plymouth Brethren
- Lady Victoria Cecil (1843–1932), married William Charles Evans-Freke, 8th Baron Carbery

Lord Exeter died in January 1867, aged 71, and was succeeded in his titles by his eldest son William. The Marchioness of Exeter died in March 1879, aged 76.

== Arms ==
Coat of arms of Brownlow Cecil, 2nd Marquess of Exeter
Crest On a chapeau gules, turned up ermine, a garb or, supported by two Lions, the dexter argent, and the sinister azure. Escutcheon Barry of ten argent and azure over all six escutcheons sable, three, two, and one, each charged with a lion rampant of the first. Supporters On either side a lion ermine. Motto Cor unum via una (One heart, one way). Orders The Most Noble Order of the Garter - Knight Companion (KG).

Political offices
Preceded by The Marquess of Breadalbane	Lord Chamberlain of the Household; 1852	Succeeded by The Marquess of Breadalbane
Preceded by The Earl of St Germans	Lord Steward of the Household; 1858–1859	Succeeded by The Earl of St Germans
Court offices
Preceded by Lord Robert Grosvenor	Groom of the Stole to Prince Albert; 1841–1846	Succeeded by The Marquess of Abercorn
Honorary titles
Preceded by The Earl of Winchilsea	Lord Lieutenant of Rutland; 1826–1867	Succeeded by The Earl of Gainsborough
Preceded by The Earl of Westmorland	Lord Lieutenant of Northamptonshire; 1842–1867	Succeeded by The Lord Southampton
Peerage of the United Kingdom
Preceded by Henry Cecil	Marquess of Exeter; 1804–1867	Succeeded by William Cecil
