= Henry Cecil, 1st Marquess of Exeter =

British politician

The Most Honourable The Marquess of Exeter FRS
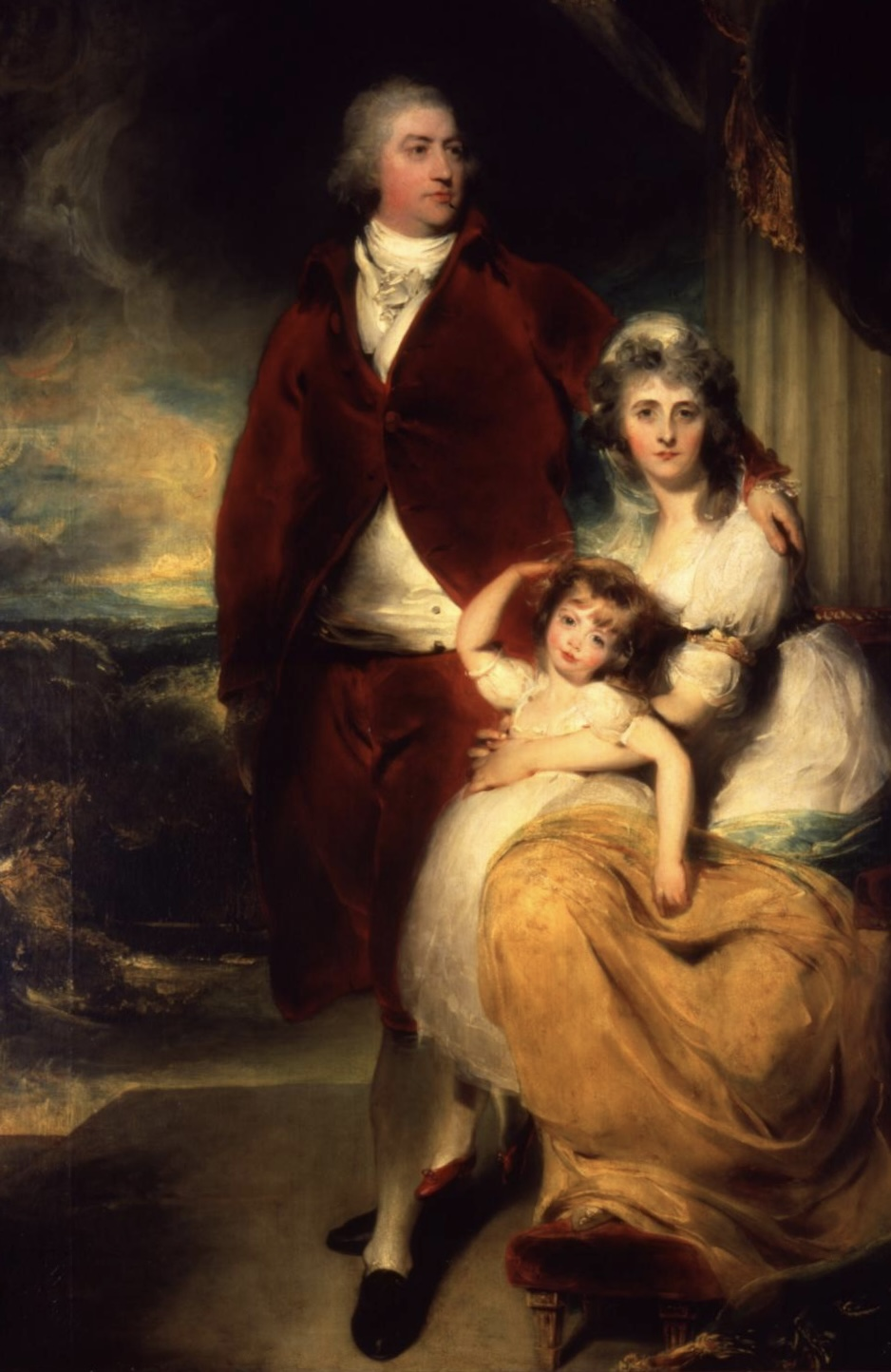
- The Marquess of Exeter with his second wife, Sarah, and their daughter, Lady Sophia Cecil. By Thomas Lawrence.

Member of Parliament for Stamford
- In office 11 October 1774 – 1790
- Preceded by: George René Aufrère
- Succeeded by: John Proby

Personal details
- Born: 14 March 1754
- Died: 1 May 1804 (aged 50)
- Spouse(s): 1. Emma Vernon (1754-1818); 2. Sarah Hoggins (1773–1797); 3. Elizabeth Burrell (1757–1837)

Henry Cecil, 1st Marquess of Exeter FRS (14 March 1754 – 1 May 1804), known as Henry Cecil from 1754 to 1793 and as The Earl of Exeter from 1793 to 1801, was a British politician who sat in the House of Commons between 1774 and 1790 and succeeded to the peerage as Earl of Exeter in 1793.

== Background ==
Exeter was the son of the Hon. Thomas Chambers Cecil, second son of Brownlow Cecil, 8th Earl of Exeter. Thomas Chambers Cecil led a profligate life, and although for a time an MP he was forced to live abroad in Brussels, where he married Charlotte Garnier, a lady of uncertain origin, said by some to be a Basque dancer. When Henry was born in 1754 he was the heir presumptive to his uncle Brownlow Cecil, 9th Earl of Exeter, and for this reason was sent when still a baby to Burghley House to be brought up. He attended Eton College and St John's College, Cambridge.

== Political career ==
In 1774, when still only 20, Cecil was returned as Member of Parliament for the family-controlled borough of Stamford, a seat he held until 1790. In 1793 he succeeded his uncle as tenth Earl of Exeter and entered the House of Lords. In February 1801 he was created Marquess of Exeter, the first marquessate to be created in the Peerage of the United Kingdom. Why this honour was bestowed upon him is unclear, because although Henry Cecil had wide interests, it is not recorded that he ever made much contribution to the House of Commons or the House of Lords.

== Family ==
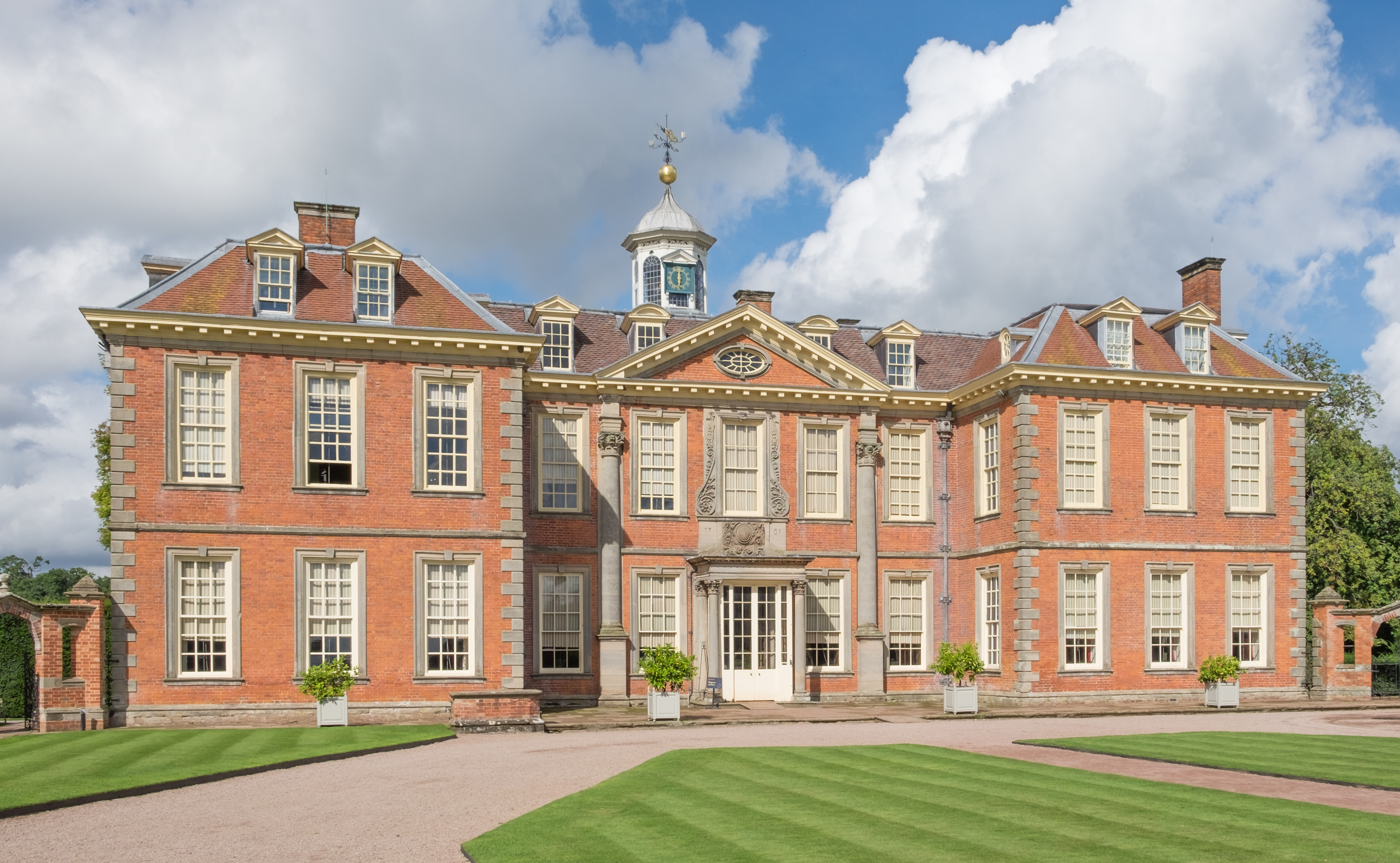
Hanbury Hall, Worcestershire

Henry Cecil married, firstly, Emma Vernon, daughter of Thomas Vernon, of Hanbury Hall, in 1776. Emma was an heiress, and was able to add the considerable income from the Vernon estates in Worcestershire (her father had died in 1771) and elsewhere to her husband's own allowance, but despite having a large income the couple seem to have got into debt. They had one son born in 1777 who died aged two months, but no further children.

In the early years of his marriage Cecil devoted his energies to modernising and improving his residence at Hanbury Hall and the estates. An enclosure act for Hanbury was passed in 1781, and exchanges of land were made to consolidate the holdings so that they could be made into more economic farms with better rents.

In 1785 a new curate for Hanbury church, the Rev. William Sneyd, was appointed, and soon afterwards Cecil's wife Emma started an affair with him. She eventually confessed what was happening to her husband in May 1789, pleading to be allowed to live with her lover, but Cecil resisted this. After much emotional turmoil, he agreed to his wife having one last meeting with Sneyd in Birmingham, and during that meeting the couple eloped together, forcing Cecil to return to Hanbury alone.

By this time Cecil was deeply in debt, and decided to abandon Hanbury for good. He instructed his friend the rector, the Rev. William Burslem, to collect the rents and use them to pay off his debts, while he left to live a quiet and simple life under an assumed name. He chose to buy a small holding in the Shropshire village of Great Bolas, and lived there calling himself John Jones. At some time thereafter he fell in love with and married in April 1790 Sarah, the 16-year-old daughter of local farmer Thomas Hoggins. As Cecil had done nothing about procuring a divorce from his first wife, the marriage was bigamous, a serious offence at the time. Only in 1791 did Cecil obtain a divorce by Act of Parliament, after which he and Sarah went through a second marriage ceremony on 3 October 1791 at St Mildred, Bread Street, London (the register records him as "Batchelor" and her as "Spinster"), thus making the union legitimate. In February of the following year their first child, Sophia, was born, and in 1793 a son Henry was born, also in Great Bolas, but died soon afterwards.

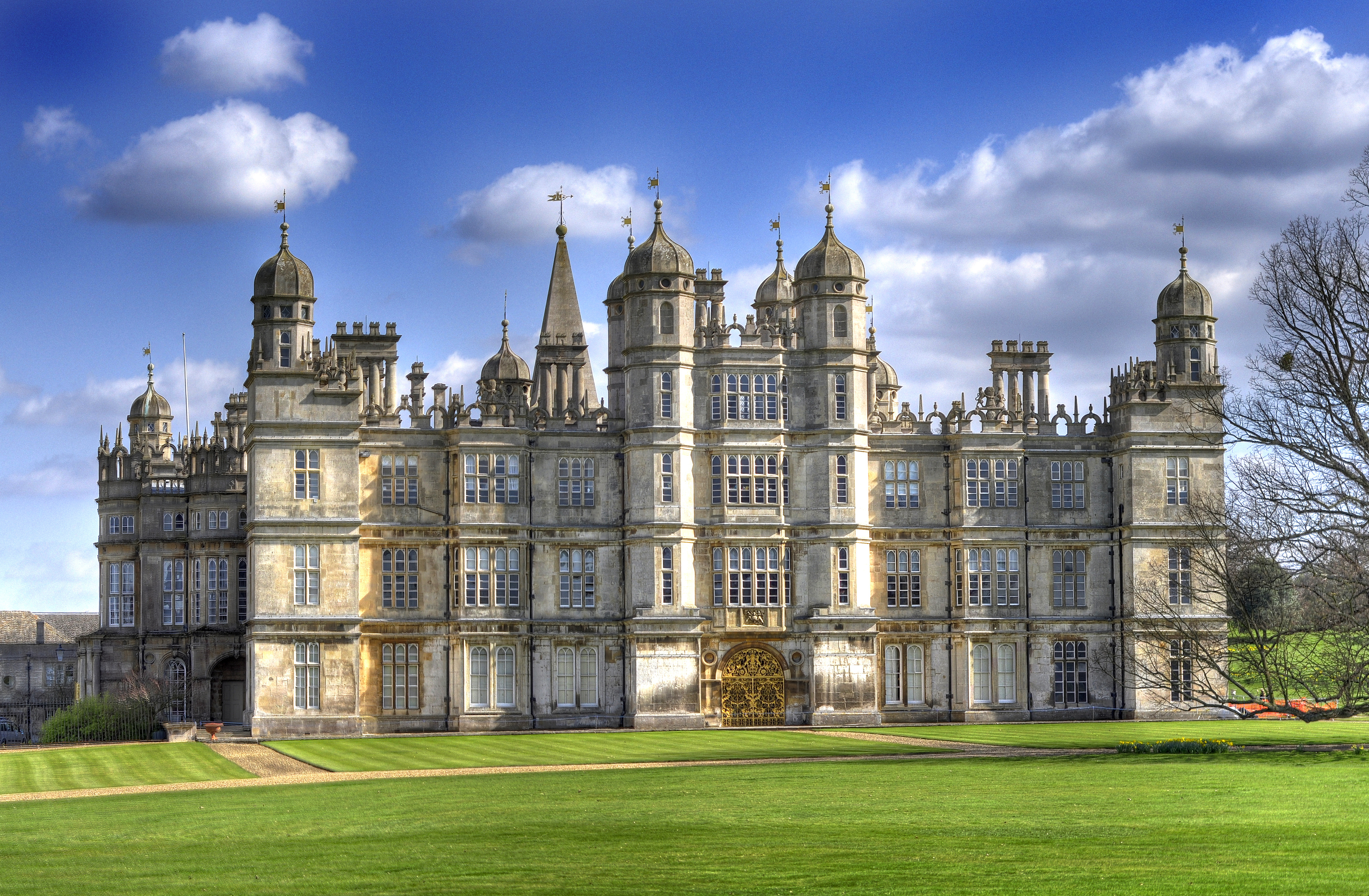
Burghley House, Cambridgeshire

In December 1793 his uncle died, and Exeter inherited the vast Cecil estates, moving to Burghley House with his new family. Sarah had two more children, Brownlow, born in 1795, who was to inherit his father's title and estates, and Thomas, born in 1797. She died following the birth of Thomas, aged only 23. Sarah became known as the Cottage Countess, and never seemed to have adapted to her role as the mistress of a great household. The episode is recounted in Tennyson's poem "The Lord of Burleigh" (1835, published 1842), and was investigated by Elisabeth Inglis-Jones in her book The Lord of Burghley and by Andrew Harris for his book The Vernons of Hanbury Hall.

In 1800 Exeter took as his third wife Elizabeth Anne Burrell, daughter of Peter Burrell and former wife of Douglas Hamilton, 8th Duke of Hamilton. They had no children. Lord Exeter died in May 1804, aged 50, and was succeeded in his titles by his eldest son, Brownlow. The Marchioness of Exeter died at Privy Gardens, Whitehall, London, in January 1837, aged 79.

== Arms ==
Coat of arms of Henry Cecil, 1st Marquess of Exeter
Crest On a chapeau gules, turned up ermine, a garb or, supported by two Lions, the dexter argent, and the sinister azure. Escutcheon Barry of ten argent and azure over all six escutcheons sable, three, two, and one, each charged with a lion rampant of the first. Supporters On either side a lion ermine.. Motto Cor unum via una (One heart, one way).

Parliament of Great Britain
Preceded by George Rene Aufrere; Sir George Howard	Member of Parliament for Stamford; 1774–1790; With: Sir George Howard	Succeeded by Sir George Howard; The Earl of Carysfort
Peerage of England
Preceded by Brownlow Cecil	Earl of Exeter; 1793–1804	Succeeded by Brownlow Cecil
Peerage of the United Kingdom
New creation	Marquess of Exeter; 1801–1804	Succeeded by Brownlow Cecil
