= William Stephen Poyntz =

English Whig politician

- A Miniature of Poyntz, by William Egley

Member of Parliament for St Albans
- In office 1800–1807

Member of Parliament for Callington
- In office 1810–1818

Member of Parliament for Chichester
- In office 1823–1830

Member of Parliament for Ashburton
- In office 1831–1835

Member of Parliament for Midhurst
- In office 1835–1835

Personal details
- Born: 20 January 1770
- Died: 8 April 1840 (aged 70)
- Spouse: Elizabeth Mary Browne
- Children: 2 daughters, including Isabella Cecil, Marchioness of Exeter
- Parents: William Poyntz (father); Isabella Courtenay (mother)

William Stephen Poyntz (20 January 1770 – 8 April 1840) was an English Whig politician who sat in the House of Commons variously between 1800 and 1837.

== Early life ==
Poyntz was the son of William Poyntz of Midgham (d.1809) by his wife Isabella (d.1805), daughter and co-heir of Kelland Courtenay of Painsford in Devon. His father was the eldest son of the courtier and diplomat Stephen Poyntz, and a brother of Georgiana Spencer, Countess Spencer, and hence William Stephen Poyntz's paternal first cousins were George Spencer, 2nd Earl Spencer, the Duchess of Devonshire and the Countess of Bessborough. His maternal first cousins and brothers-in law (through the marriages of his sisters Isabella and Carolina) were Edmund Boyle, 8th Earl of Cork, and Vice-Admiral Sir Courtenay Boyle.

He matriculated at Christ Church, Oxford in 1787.

== Career ==
In June 1800, Poyntz was elected at a by-election as a Member of Parliament (MP) for St Albans and held the seat until the 1807 general election. He was next elected as MP for Callington at a by-election in April 1810, and held the seat until the 1818 general election. In February 1823 he was elected at a by-election as MP for Chichester, and held the seat until the 1830 general election. In March 1831 Poyntz was elected at a by-election as MP for Ashburton, where he was re-elected in May 1831 and held the seat until the 1835 general election, when he was elected MP for Midhurst. He was re-elected in 1837, and held the seat until his resignation later in 1837 by taking the Chiltern Hundreds.

== Personal life ==
On 1 September 1794, Poyntz married the Hon. Elizabeth Mary Browne, daughter of Anthony Browne, 7th Viscount Montagu, and sister and heiress of her brother the 8th Viscount. They lived at Midgham House in Berkshire and at Cowdray Park in West Sussex, which came to the Poyntz family after the death of the 8th Viscount Montagu.

Together, they had several children. Their two sons both drowned at Bognor Regis on 7 July 1815. Only two of their daughters had issue:

- Elizabeth Georgina Poyntz, who married Frederick Spencer, 4th Earl Spencer
- Isabella Poyntz, who married Brownlow Cecil, 2nd Marquess of Exeter.

Poyntz died in 1840, at the age of seventy.

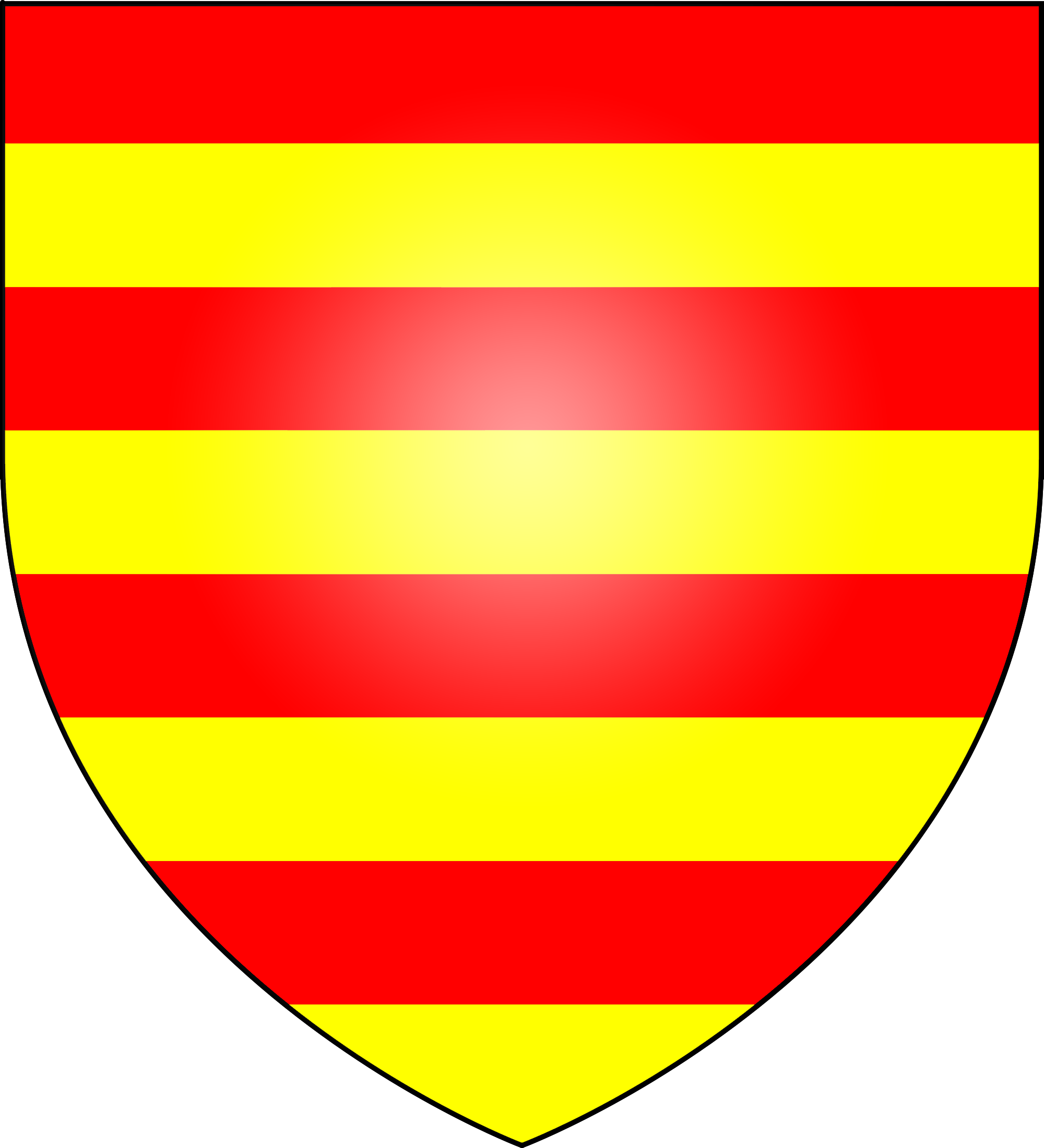
Poyntz of Cowdray Park

== Arms ==
The arms of the head of the Poyntz family of Cowdray Park are blazoned Barry of eight gules and or.

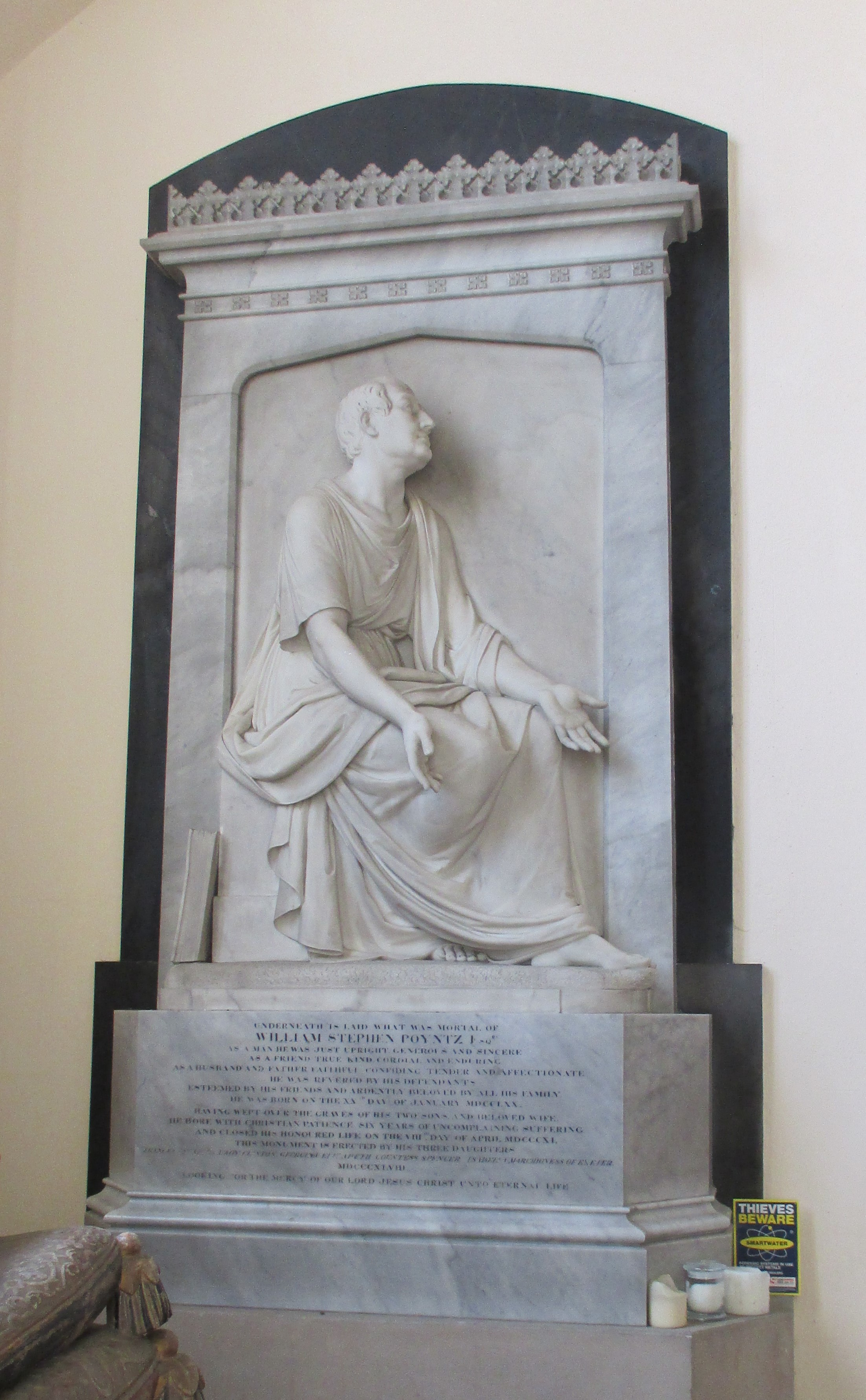
The monument to William Poyntz, by Raffaele Monti, in St Mary's Church, Easebourne, West Sussex

Parliament of Great Britain
Preceded by Richard Bingham; Thomas Bucknall	Member of Parliament for St Albans; June 1800 – December 1800; With: Thomas Bucknall	Succeeded by Parliament of the United Kingdom
Parliament of the United Kingdom
Preceded by Parliament of Great Britain	Member of Parliament for St Albans; 1801 – 1807; With: Thomas Bucknall; Hon. James Grimston	Succeeded by Joseph Thompson Halsey; Hon. James Grimston
Preceded by Lord Binning; Thomas Carter	Member of Parliament for Callington; 1810 – 1818; With: Lord Binning 1810–1812; Sir John Rogers, 6th Baronet 1812–1813; Hon. Charles Trefusis 1813–1818	Succeeded by Hon. Edward Pyndar Lygon; Sir Christopher Robinson
Preceded by Lord John Lennox; William Huskisson	Member of Parliament for Chichester; 1823 – 1830; With: Lord John Lennox	Succeeded by Lord John Lennox; John Smith
Preceded by Charles Arbuthnot; Sir Lawrence Palk, Bt	Member of Parliament for Ashburton; March 1831 – 1835; With: Sir Lawrence Palk, Bt; Robert Torrens May 1831–1832	Succeeded by Charles Lushington
Preceded by Hon. Frederick Spencer	Member of Parliament for Midhurst; 1835 – 1837	Succeeded by Hon. Frederick Spencer
