= Banana, Democratic Republic of the Congo =

Port town in Kongo Central, DRC

Banana
- Location in Democratic Republic of the Congo
- Coordinates: 6°1′S 12°25′E
- Country: Democratic Republic of the Congo
- Province: Kongo Central

Population
  - Total: 3,165

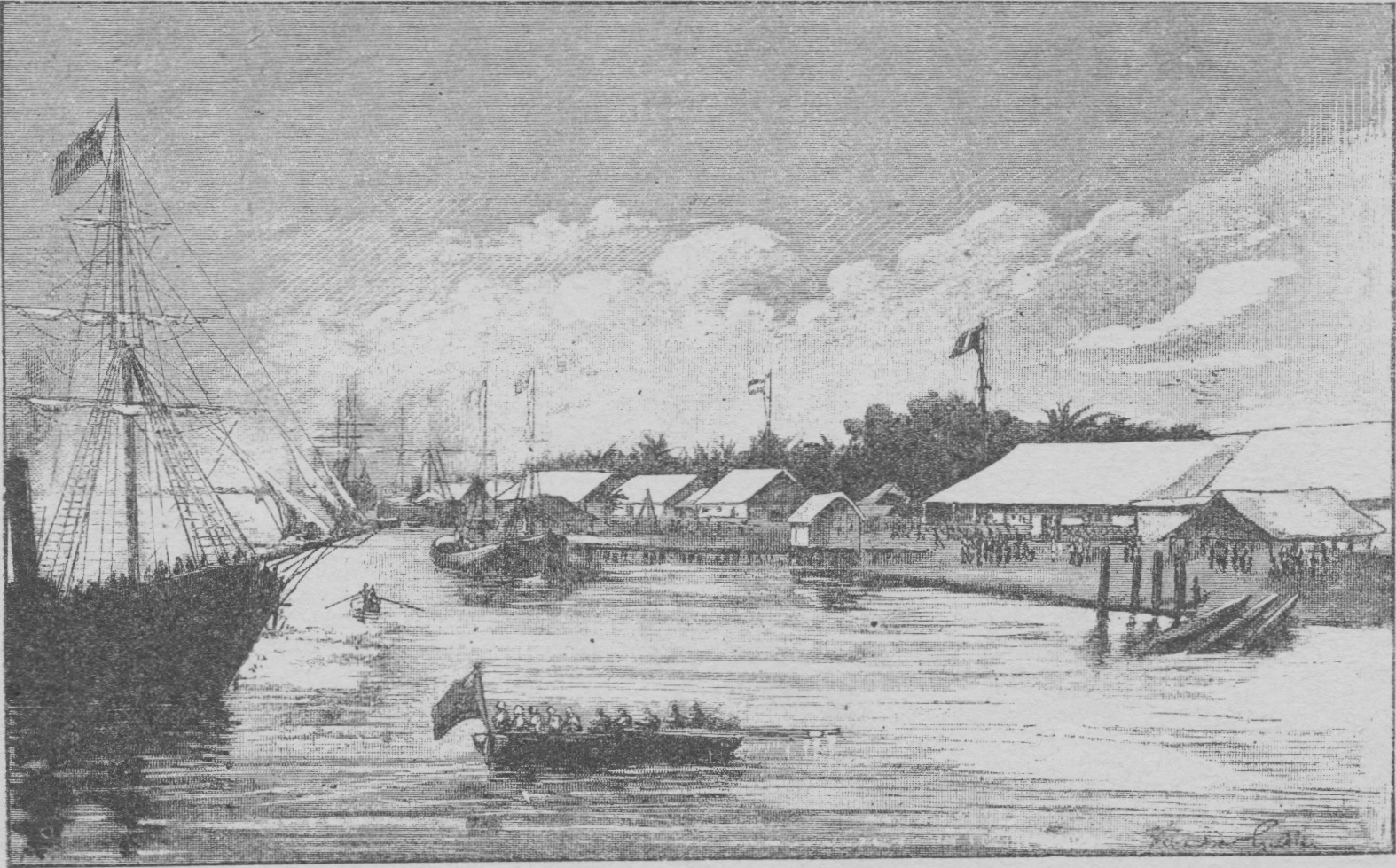
Banana in 1887

Banana is a small seaport in the Kongo Central province of the Democratic Republic of the Congo on the Atlantic coast. The port is situated in Banana Creek, an inlet about 1 km wide on the north bank of the Congo River's mouth, separated from the ocean by a spit of land 3 km long and 100 to 400 m wide. The port is located on the creek side of the spit, which shelters it from the ocean. It is about 8 km south-east of Muanda to which it is connected by a paved road running along the coast.

== Facilities ==
The port of Banana consists of one wharf of 75 m and depth 5.18 m, with two small cranes for cargo handling and a few small jetties. The port has an oil terminal 4 km further upriver, at which tankers discharge while at anchor in the creek. This terminal has road access separate from the main port east of Muanda. There are no major facilities in Banana apart from the port, since these are provided by the much larger town of Muanda, where the nearest airport is located. There is no rail link.

There is also a naval base of the Navy of the Democratic Republic of the Congo, which is partly maintained with Chinese assistance.

In early 2022, a $1.2 billion construction project began to turn the port into the DRC's first deep-water port. The work is being carried out by DP World, despite a lack of public tender, as part of a 30 year development and management contract. DP World selected the Portuguese Mota-Engil as lead engineering company. When completed in early 2027, the port is expected to process over 450,000 containers per year. The project has been criticized for its potential environmental threats, since it borders the country's Mangroves National Park, home to vulnerable and endangered plant and animal species.

== Climate ==
Climate data for Banana
Month	Jan	Feb	Mar	Apr	May	Jun	Jul	Aug	Sep	Oct	Nov	Dec	Year
Mean daily maximum °C (°F)	31 (87)	31 (87)	31 (88)	31 (88)	30 (86)	27 (81)	26 (78)	26 (78)	27 (80)	28 (83)	29 (85)	30 (86)	29 (84)
Mean daily minimum °C (°F)	24 (75)	24 (75)	24 (76)	24 (75)	23 (73)	21 (69)	19 (66)	19 (66)	22 (71)	23 (74)	24 (75)	24 (75)	23 (73)
Average precipitation mm (inches)	28 (1.1)	170 (6.6)	150 (6)	140 (5.5)	110 (4.2)	2.5 (0.1)	2.5 (0.1)	2.5 (0.1)	2.5 (0.1)	10 (0.4)	94 (3.7)	69 (2.7)	770 (30.4)
Source: Weatherbase

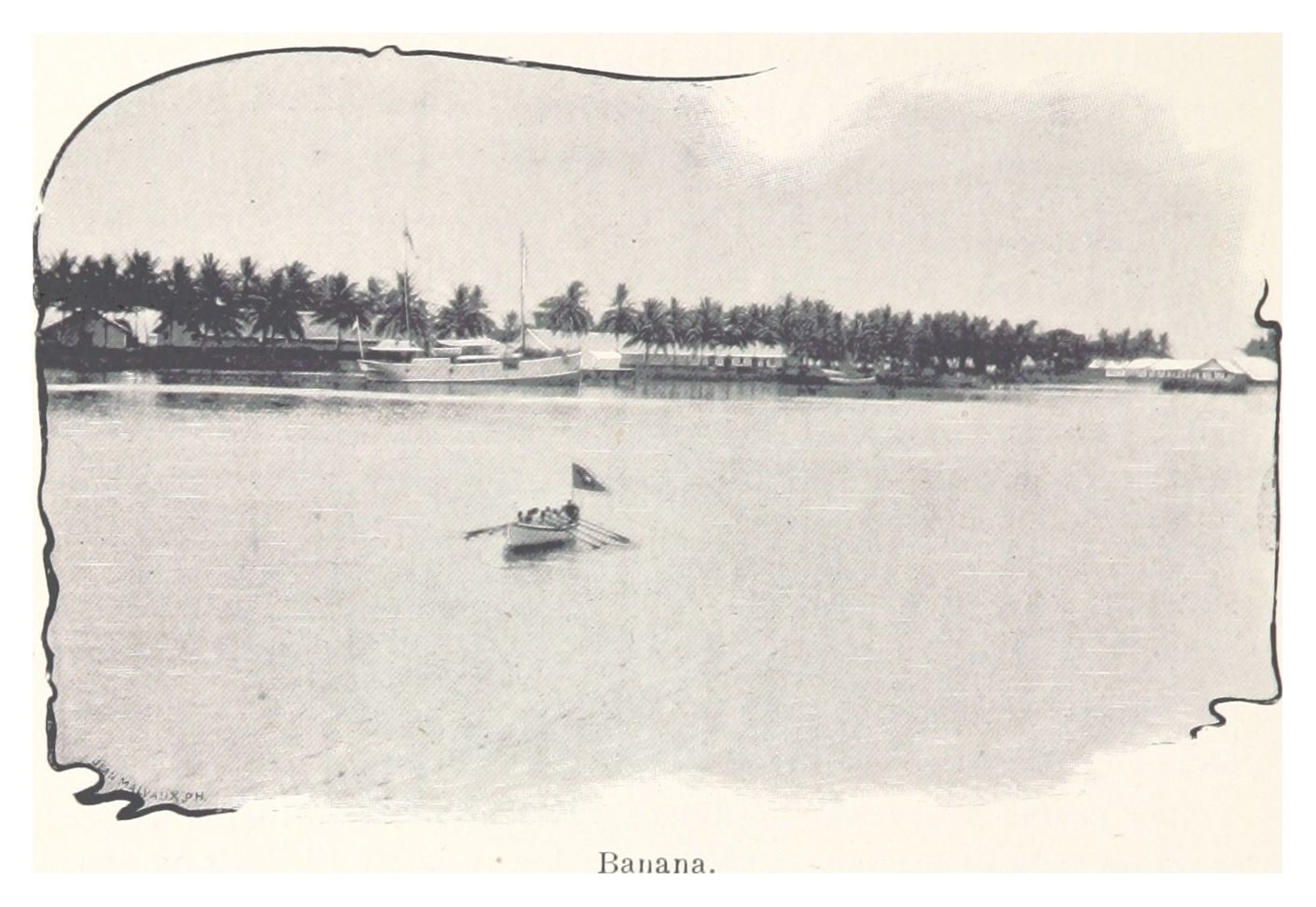
Landing in Banana, Congo (1899)

== History ==
The town was developed as a port in the 19th century, largely as part of the slave trade. Henry Morton Stanley arrived at Banana in 1879 at the start of an exploratory expedition funded by Leopold II of Belgium. Following the Conference of Berlin (1884–85) the European powers recognised Léopold's claim to the Congo Basin and the establishment of the Congo Free State, headed by himself, beginning the period of European colonization.

The Encyclopædia Britannica Eleventh Edition (1911) article on the folkloric belief in werewolves noted that "The people of Banana are said to change themselves by magical means, composed of human embryos and other ingredients, but in their leopard form they may do no hurt to mankind under pain of retaining for ever the beast shape."

Banana was the main Belgian naval base of the Congo until independence in 1960.

== Notable people ==
- Mahomet Thomas Phillips (1876–1943), sculptor and stone mason

== See also ==
- Transport in the Democratic Republic of the Congo
