= St Martin's Church, Stamford =

Church in Lincolnshire, England

Coordinates: 52°38′57″N 00°28′37″W

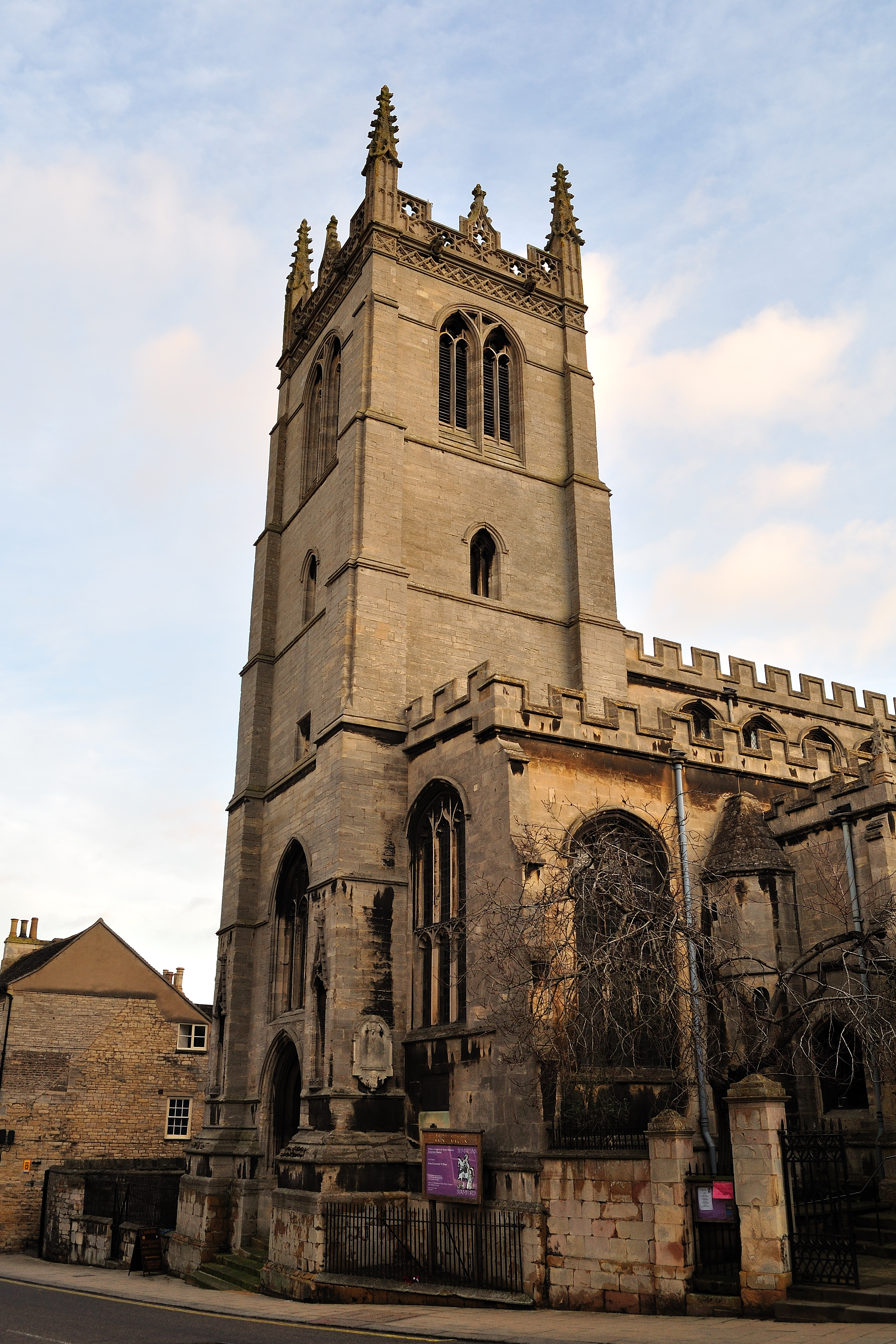
- St Martin's Church, Stamford
- St Martin's Church, Stamford
- Denomination: Church of England
- Churchmanship: Broad Church
- Website: www.stamfordchurches.co.uk/st-martins.shtml

History
- Dedication: Saint Martin

Administration
- Province: Canterbury
- Diocese: Lincoln
- Parish: St Martin's Without

Clergy
- Priest: Vacant

St Martin's Church, Stamford, is a Grade I listed parish church in the Church of England located in Stamford, Lincolnshire, England. The area of the town south of the River Welland was in Northamptonshire until 1889 and is called Stamford Baron or St Martin's.

== History ==
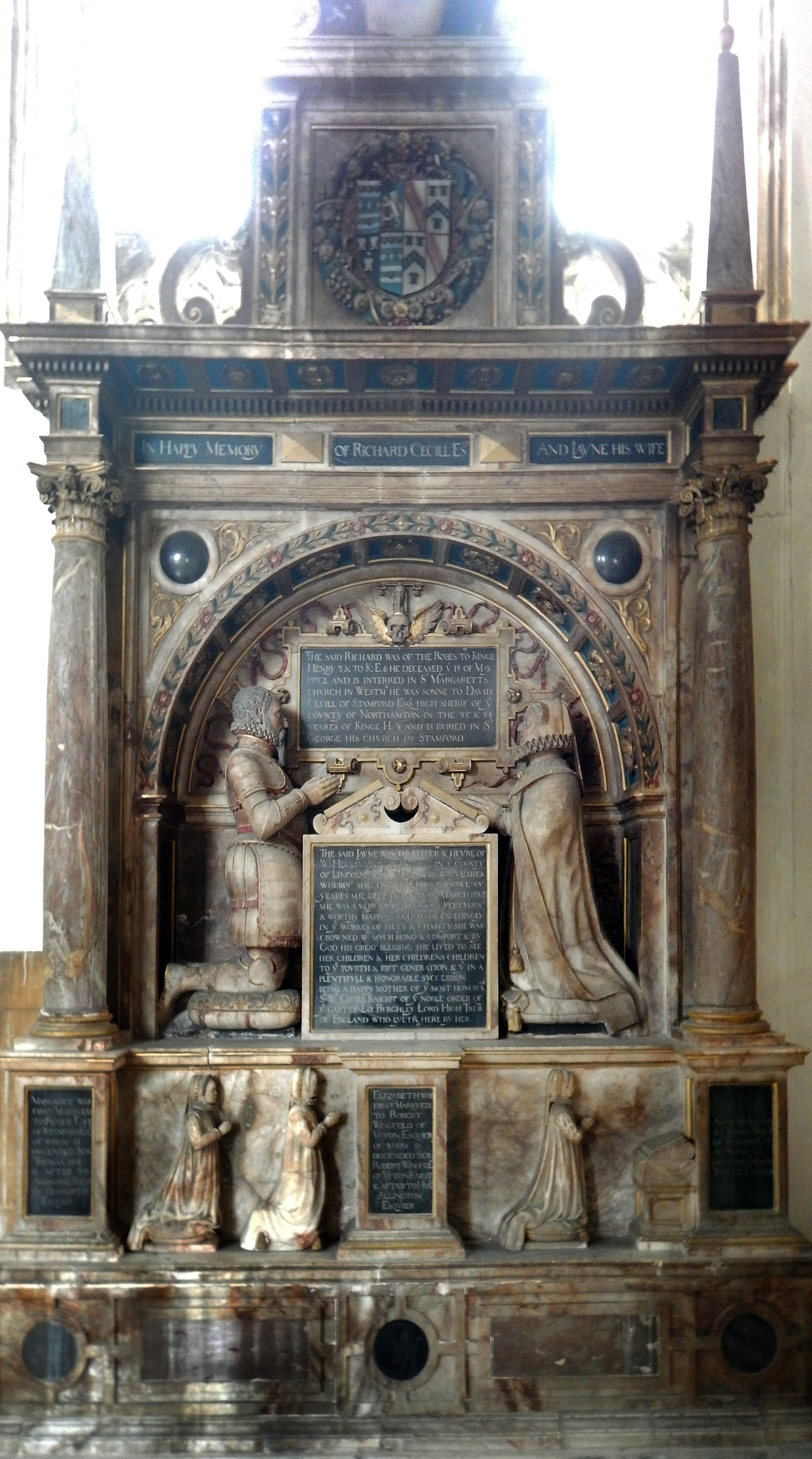
Tomb of Sir Richard Cecil (died 1553)

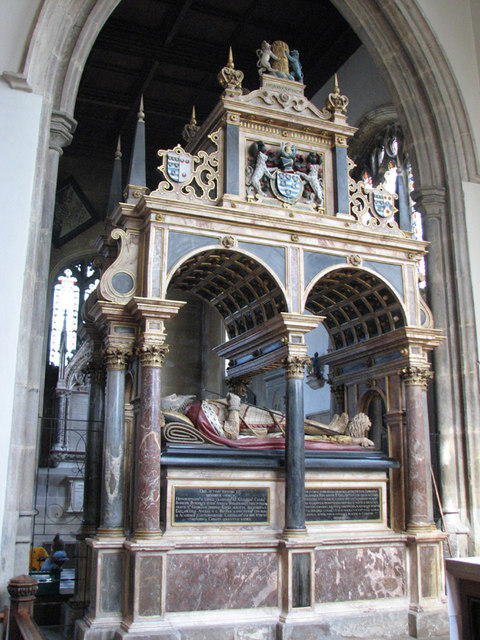
Tomb of William Cecil, Lord Burghley (died 1598)

A church was first erected here between 1133 and 1147 by Martin de Vecti (also known as Martin de Bec), Abbot of Peterborough from 1133 to 1155. He dedicated the church to the saint whose name he held. It is thought that the church may have been damaged in Wars of the Roses by Lancastrian forces in 1461. By 1473 it was reported as being in a ruinous state. Rebuilding was started in 1482, and completed in 1485 in the Perpendicular style.

The majority of the mediaeval coloured glass was bought by the Earl of Exeter from the Church of the Holy Trinity at Tattershall in 1754.

The church was re-ordered in 1843 by Edward Browning when new pews and a new pulpit were installed. The Cecil Chapel was extended to the north in 1865 and houses the tombs of the Cecil family, including monuments to Sir Richard Cecil, William Cecil, first Lord Burghley, and John Cecil, 5th Earl of Exeter. During the nineteenth century the church also received a new nave roof, a lowered floor, new bells and in 1890 a new organ. New choir stalls and an altar were erected in 1894 as a result of a general subscription in the parish.

Later additions in 1920-30s include a new screen and pulpit with carvings by Mahomet Thomas Phillips while working at Bowman & Sons.

Properly it is the Church of St Martin Without, Stamford Baron.

Burials include Dutch portrait painter William Wissing (1687), in the churchyard, and Daniel Lambert (1809), in the detached part of the churchyard.

== Memorials ==
- Sir Richard Cecil (d. 1555)
- William Cecil, 1st Baron Burghley (d. 1598)
- William Wissing (painter) (d. 1687)
- John Cecil, 5th Earl of Exeter (d. 1700) (by Pierre-Étienne Monnot)
- Edward Henry Cecil (d. 1862) and Henry Poyntz Cecil (d. 1858) (by Giovanni Maria Benzoni)
- Brownlow Cecil, 2nd Marquess of Exeter (d. 1867) and his wife Isabella Cecil, Marchioness of Exeter (d. 1879)
- Lord Thomas Cecil (d. 1873) (by Millward & Co, London)
- Benjamin Disraeli, 1st Earl of Beaconsfield (d. 1881)
- Thomas Cooper Goodrich (d. 1885)
- Adelbert Percy Cecil (d. 1889)
- William Cecil, 3rd Marquess of Exeter (d. 1895) and his wife Georgiana Sophia Pakenham (d. 1909)
- Brownlow Cecil, 4th Marquess of Exeter (d. 1898) and his wife Isabella Whichcote (d.1917)
- William Cecil, 5th Marquess of Exeter (d. 1956) and his wife Myra Rowena Sibell (d. 1973) (by Bowman and Sons of Ketton stone)
- David Cecil, 6th Marquess of Exeter (d. 1981) and his first wife Mary Theresa (d. 1984) and his second wife DIana Mary (d. 1982)
- William Martin Alleyne, 7th Marquess of Exeter (d. 1988)

== Bells ==
The church tower holds a ring of 6 bells. They were all cast in 1850 by Charles and George Mears. The tenor weight is 1,505 pounds (683 kg).

== Organ ==
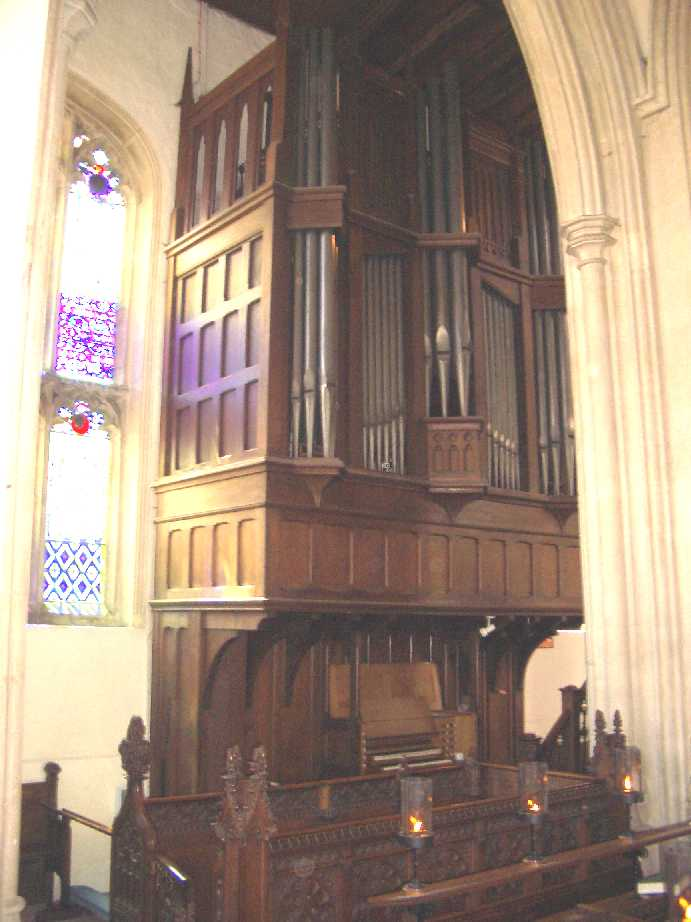
The organ case in St Martin's

Until 1890 the organ sat in a gallery at the west end. It comprised two manuals and 14 stops. The current organ is by Bevington and it was dedicated on 23 May 1890. At the dedication service at 11.00am Haydn Keeton, the organist of Peterborough Cathedral, presided at the organ. Haydon Hare gave a recital in the afternoon on the same day. A specification of the organ can be found on the National Pipe Organ Register.

=== List of organists ===
- John Speechley ???? – 1833, (afterwards organist of St Paul's Church, Bedford, later organist of Peterborough Cathedral)
- Charles C Noble 1833 – 1836 (afterward organist of St Mary's Church, Nottingham)
- Richard Layton 1836 – ca. 1846 – ca. 1876
- William Jonathan Bettle
- John Clare Billing 1918 – 1927
- Miss D. Tebbutt 1927 - 1935
- R. Frost 1935 - 1938
- F. Rony 1938 - 1939
- E. Willey 1939 (formerly assistant organist at St Modwen’s Church, Sutton-in-Ashfield)
- Ernest John Charles Warner 1952 – circa 1987
- Graham Johnson
- Harold Harvey (Also St Mary's)
- Gary Seiling (Also St Mary's)
- Fergus Black (Also St Mary's)
