= Isabella Cecil, Marchioness of Exeter =

The Most Honourable The Marchioness of Exeter
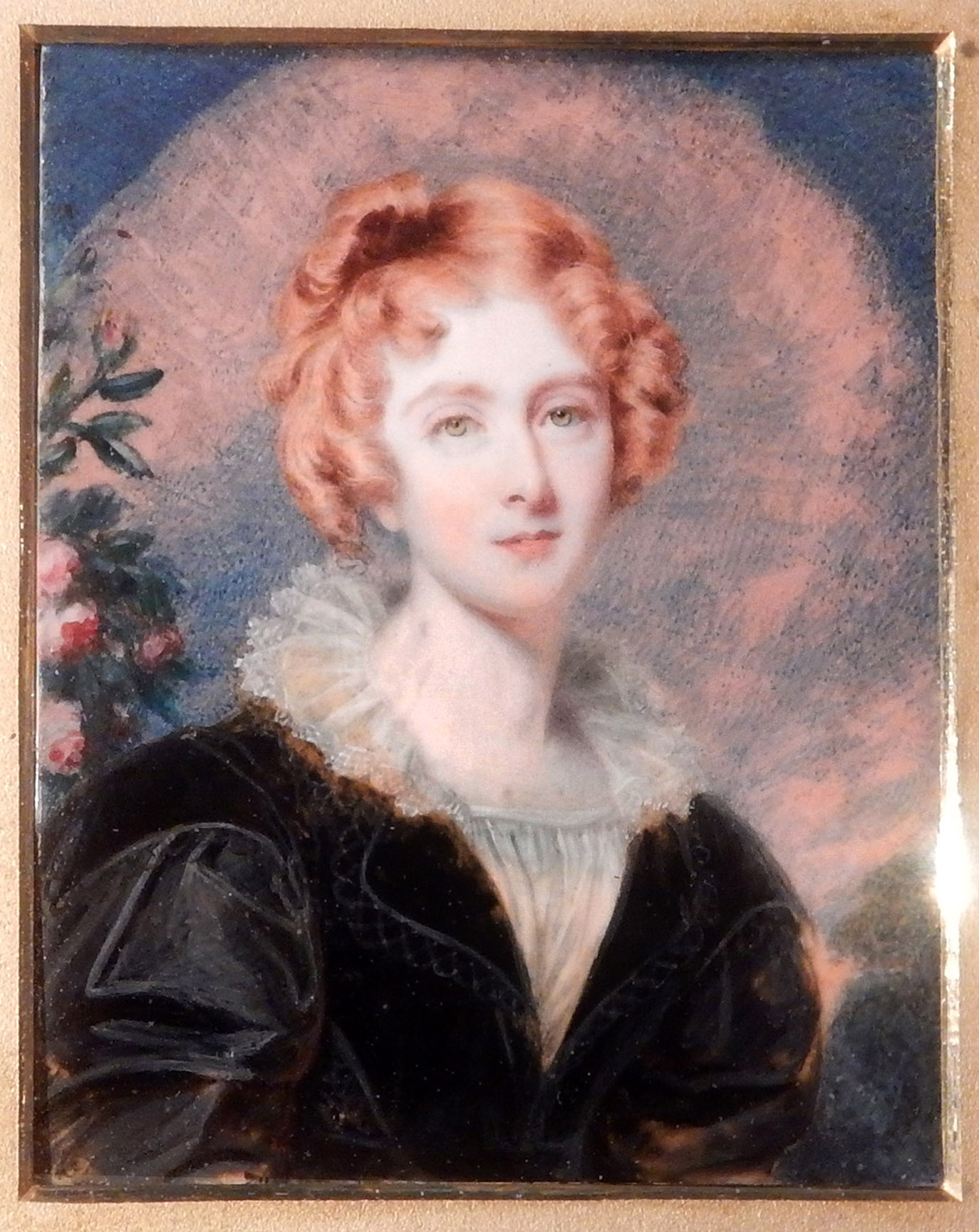
- Miniature of Isabella, Marchioness of Exeter, by William John Newton (1830). Held in the Burghley House collection
- Born: Isabella Poyntz; 6 March 1803
- Died: 6 March 1879 (aged 76)
- Resting place: St Martin's Church, Stamford
- Spouse: Brownlow Cecil, 2nd Marquess of Exeter (m. 1824; died 1867)
- Children: Mary Ryder, Countess of Harrowby; William Cecil, 3rd Marquess of Exeter; Col. Lord Brownlow Cecil; Commander Lord Edward Cecil; Lord Adelbert Cecil; Victoria Evans-Freke, Baroness Carbery
- Parent(s): William Stephen Poyntz; Hon. Elizabeth Mary Browne

Isabella Cecil, Marchioness of Exeter (6 March 1803 – 6 March 1879), formerly Isabella Poyntz, was the wife of Brownlow Cecil, 2nd Marquess of Exeter, and the mother of the 3rd Marquess.

== Biography ==
She was the daughter of William Stephen Poyntz, a Liberal MP, and his wife, the former Hon. Elizabeth Mary Browne. Isabella's sister, Elizabeth Georgina Poyntz, married Frederick Spencer, 4th Earl Spencer. Another sister, Frances Selina Isabella Poyntz, married Robert Cotton St. John Trefusis, 18th Baron Clinton, and, on his death, married Sir Horace Seymour, MP. Two of their brothers were drowned in a boating accident in 1815.

The Poyntz family had homes at Midgham House in Berkshire and Cowdray Park in West Sussex.

=== Children ===
Isabella married the Marquess of Exeter in London on 12 May 1824. Their children were:

- Lady Mary Frances Cecil (died 1917), who married Dudley Francis Stuart Ryder, 3rd Earl of Harrowby, and had no children
- William Alleyne Cecil, 3rd Marquess of Exeter (1825-1895)
- Colonel Lord Brownlow Thomas Montagu Cecil (1827-1905)
- Commander Lord Edward Cecil (1834-1862)
- Lord Adelbert Percy Cecil (1841–1889), who was a member of the Plymouth Brethren and died, unmarried, in Canada
- Lady Victoria Cecil (1843-1932), who married William Charles Evans-Freke, 8th Baron Carbery, and had children

The 2nd Marquess died in 1867 and his estates passed to the oldest son William. Isabella moved to 32 Upper Brook Street, Mayfair, where she died in 1879, aged 76: she was buried with her husband in the Cecil family chapel at St Martin's Church, Stamford.
