= Bellmount Tower =

18th-century tower in Lincolnshire, England

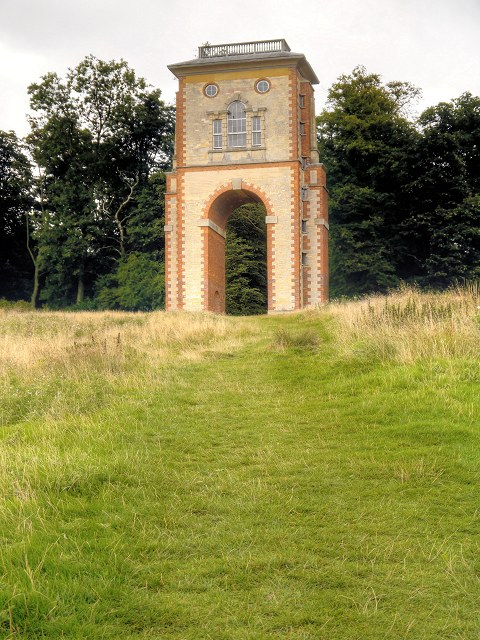
- Bellmount tower in 2013

- Location within Lincolnshire

General information
- Type: Tower
- Coordinates: 52.938343°N 0.58940148°W

Bellmount Tower is a historic tower, dating to the 18th-century, located near Belton Park, Belton, Lincolnshire, England. It is a grade II* listed building. The tower was commissioned by John Brownlow, 1st Viscount Tyrconnel as one of several buildings on the Belton estate. It was remodelled in c.1780, damaged by fire in 1841, and restored in 1989.
