= Manthorpe, Grantham =

Village in South Kesteven district, Lincolnshire, England

Coordinates: 52.928920°N 0.632405°W

Manthorpe
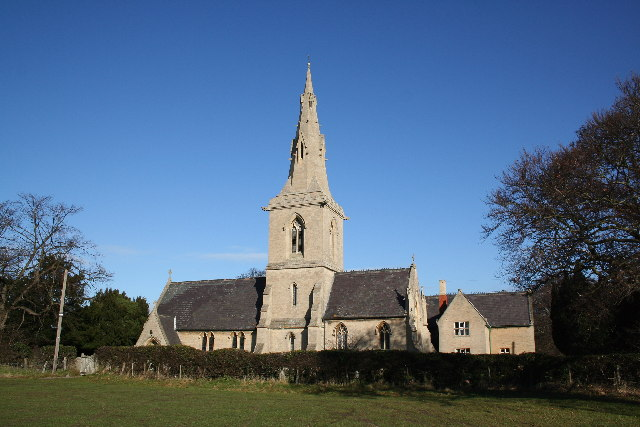
- Parish church of St John the Evangelist

- Location within Lincolnshire
- OS grid reference: SK920377
  - London: 100 mi (160 km) south
- Civil parish: Belton and Manthorpe
- District: South Kesteven
- Shire county: Lincolnshire
- Region: East Midlands
- Country: England
- Sovereign state: United Kingdom
- Post town: Grantham
- Postcode district: NG31
- Dialling code: 01476
- Police: Lincolnshire
- Fire: Lincolnshire
- Ambulance: East Midlands
- UK Parliament: Grantham and Bourne

Manthorpe is a village in the civil parish of Belton and Manthorpe, in the South Kesteven district of Lincolnshire, England. It is on the northern edge of the town of Grantham and on the Grantham to Lincoln A607 road, between the East Coast Main Line and the River Witham.

The infamous unsolved murder of Julie Pacey occurred in the area in 1994. It is believed the unidentified killer may have also been local to the area.

== History ==
Before the 19th century, Manthorpe parish was agricultural and known as Little Gonerby-cum-Manthorpe. The Grantham to Lincoln road followed what is now Low Road, across the river behind Swallow's Mill, through Belton Park and along the old route to the Roman town of Ancaster on the Ermine Street Roman Road.

In 1810 the Brownlow family, owners of Belton Park and House just north of Manthorpe, built a new road from Grantham to Belton. In the 1840s and 1850s new houses, a church and school were built, and established properties were renovated.

The Church of England parish church of St John the Evangelist was designed by architect George Gordon Place of Nottingham and built in 1847–48. It was built as an estate church by the Brownlow family to serve Belton Estate workers.

The 1885 Kelly's Directory describes Manthorpe as "a small and pleasant village". It was an ecclesiastical district established in 1849 from the civil parish of Grantham and the village formed a township with Little Gonerby. It was within the Grantham parliamentary borough, the rural deanery of North Grantham, and the archdeaconry and Diocese of Lincoln. Manthorpe's church of St John the Evangelist, consecrated by the Bishop of Lincoln in 1848, is in early Decorated style. It consists of a chancel, nave, south porch, and vestry, and a tower with two bells and a spire 50 feet (15 m) high. The church, graveyard and parsonage sites were provided by Earl Brownlow, who also paid for construction of the parsonage. The earl's brother, Richard Cust, St John's Rector in 1885, built the church at his own expense. Bequests from the brothers provided the living – a vicarage united with that of Londonthorpe. The parish register dates from 1849, but earlier records for Manthorpe appear in Grantham registers.

Kelly's describes the area as being skirted on the north by a formation of blue lias, and on the south by oolite, with land being of sand with a gravel subsoil. Chief crops grown were wheat, barley, oats and turnips, in a township area of 1,228 acres (497 ha) that included Little Gonerby. In 1881 the ecclesiastical district contained a population of 243, and the Manthorpe-cum-Little Gonerby township, 3,567. An infants school for 50 children, with an average attendance of 30, was erected in 1865 with financial support from Earl Brownlow. Township occupations included four farmers, two cow-keepers, a grazier, a wheelwright, three shopkeepers, and a miller at Manthorpe Mill, a watermill.

In 1894 Manthorpe became a civil parish, being formed from the rural part of Manthorpe cum Little Gonerby, on 1 April 1931 the parish was abolished and merged with Belton to form "Belton and Manthorpe". In 1931 the parish had a population of 166.

In the early 20th century, houses began to be connected to electricity, with others supplied with water by a village pump or their own well. Eventually the Brownlow estate connected water and electricity to all households.

By the late 1940s there were about a dozen houses west of Manthorpe Road, with the village still separated from Grantham. During the 1950s and 1960s houses were built west of Manthorpe Road and on the side of the River Witham. In the 1960s Grantham became conjoined to the village after the Manthorpe housing estate was built on the north side of the town. When the 6th Lord Brownlow died, in 1978, further land became available and most cottages in Manthorpe village were sold.

== Community ==
The nearest schools are situated on the Manthorpe estate in Grantham. These are The Priory Ruskin Academy, (formerly the Central Technology & Sports College), a mixed-sex secondary school on Rushcliffe Road, and Cliffedale Primary School on Northcliffe Road.

The ecclesiastical parish is the benefice of Grantham Manthorpe, of the Deanery of Grantham. The Vicar of Manthorpe since 2014 is Fr Stuart Cradduck, who is also the Rector of St Wulfram's, Grantham.

The nearest shop is a convenience store on the corner of Sandcliffe Road and Rushcliffe Road, on the Manthorpe estate. The closest supermarkets are in Grantham. Manthorpe has its own Residents' Association.
