= Belton House Boathouse =

Historic building in Lincolnshire, England

Boathouse at Belton House
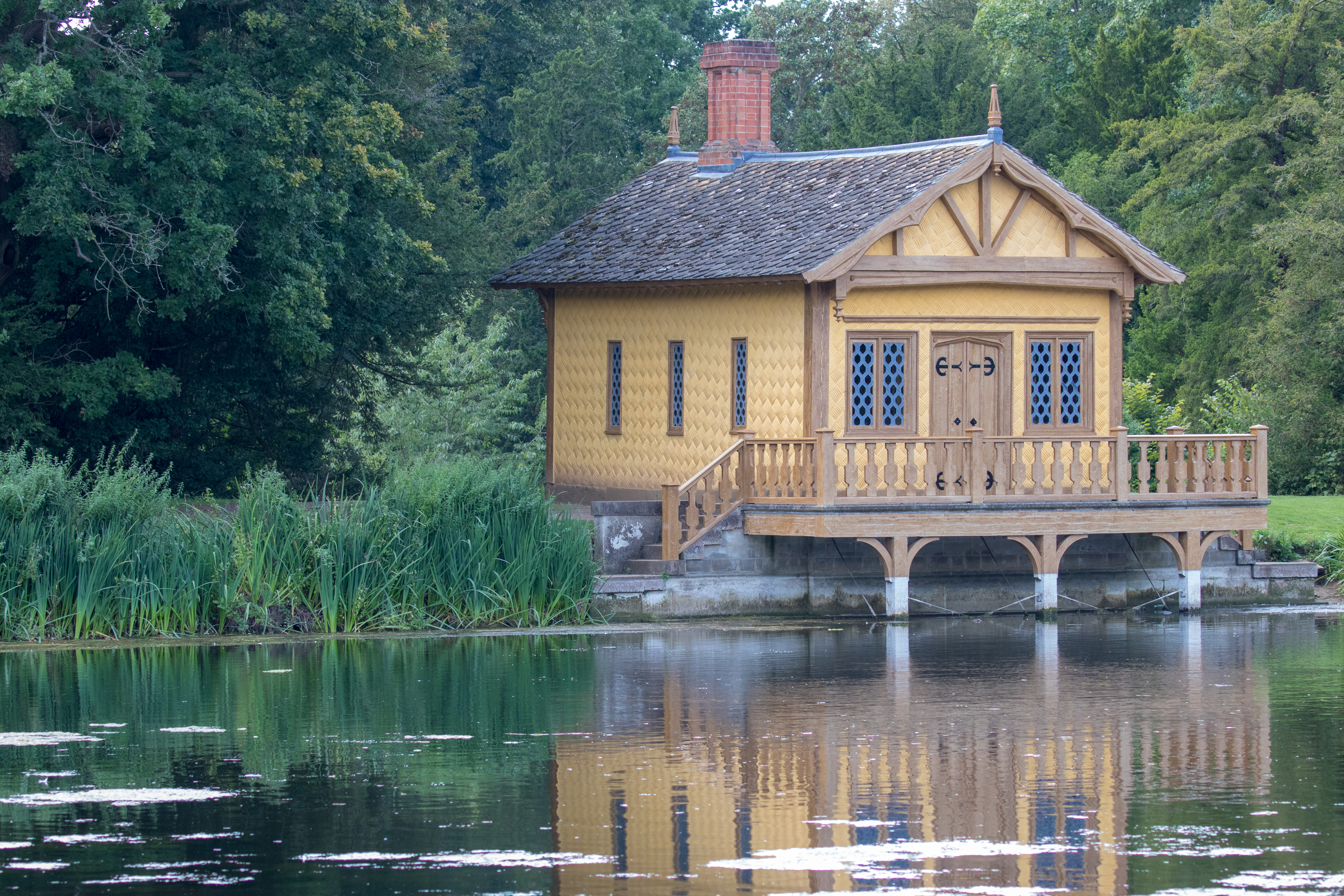
- The Boathouse after restoration in 2008

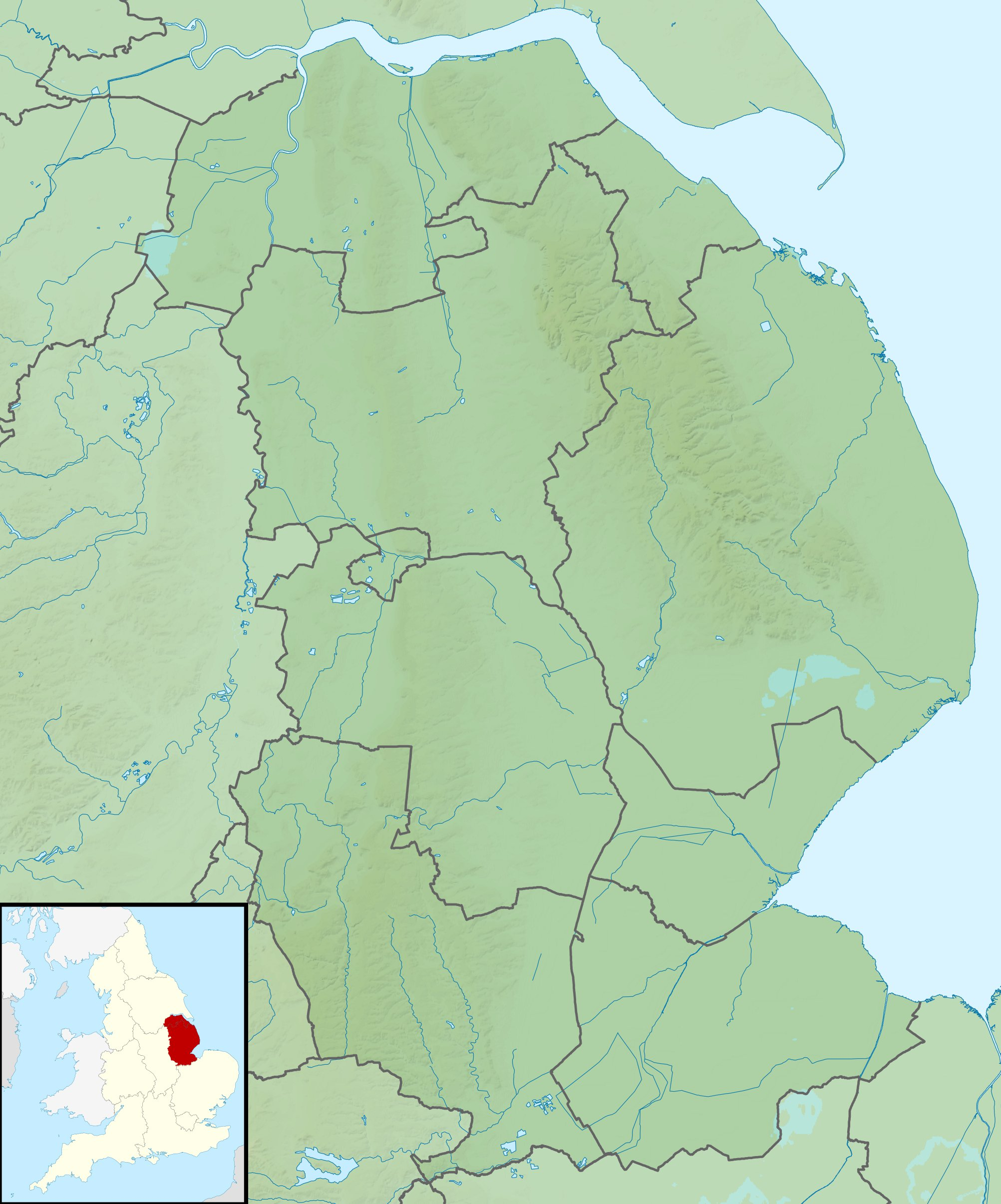
- Location within Lincolnshire
- 52.9432°N 0.6102°W
- Type: Boathouse
- Location: Belton, Lincolnshire

History
- Built: 1838–1839; 187 years ago

Site notes
- Architect: Anthony Salvin
- Architectural style: Swiss chalet style
- Governing body: National Trust for Places of Historic Interest or Natural Beauty

Listed Building – Grade II
- Official name: Boathouse at the South End of Boathouse Pond
- Designated: 14 November 1994
- Reference no.: 1264997

The Boathouse on Boathouse Pond, Belton House, Belton, Lincolnshire was designed by Anthony Salvin in 1838–1839. It is a Grade II listed building.

== History ==
John Cust, 1st Earl Brownlow, owner of Belton House from 1807 to 1853 commissioned Salvin to undertake improvements to the Belton Estate in 1838. Salvin's additions included a public house, a cross in Belton Village, cottages and houses for a gamekeeper and a blacksmith, a hermitage and the boathouse on Boathouse Pond. Most of the work was carried out in a Tudor style but the boathouse was built to resemble a Swiss Cottage. Salvin did not complete the works, being replaced by Cust's Clerk of works. The boathouse fell into disrepair in the 20th century and was unrestored at the time Historic England's listed building entry was written. Its restoration in 2008, carried out under the auspices of the National Trust, which now owns Belton House, made use of traditional materials and craftsmanship and has won a number of awards. The boathouse is a Grade II listed building.

== Architecture ==
The boathouse stands at the lower end of the pond. It is designed in the style of a Swiss Cottage. This style was popular in mid-Victorian England and another example of such a chalet can be seen at Osborne House on the Isle of Wight. The boathouse is timber-framed and plastered. The roof is of Collyweston slate tiles in a fish scale pattern.
