= Coastlink =

Bus network owned by First Bus East of England

Coastlink is a bus network owned by First Bus East of England that runs around Norfolk and Suffolk. Buses on Coastlink can be seen around Gorleston-on-Sea, Beccles, Loddon, Great Yarmouth, Norwich, Acle and Lowestoft. They can also be seen around Belton. Buses used on this network include the Alexander Dennis Enviro400 and the Volvo B9TL Wright Eclipse Gemini. The routes these buses use are the X1, which runs from Lowestoft to Norwich via Great Yarmouth and the James Paget University Hospital, the X2, which runs from Lowestoft to Norwich via Loddon and Beccles, the X22, which runs from Lowestoft to Norwich via Beccles and Carlton Colville, the X21, which runs from Lowestoft to Norwich via Pakefield, Beccles and Loddon, and the X11 running from Beccles to Norwich via Great Yarmouth and the James Paget University Hospital.

Coastlink was officially announced on 12th August 2020, though passenger services didn't commence until the 18th. The first bus to be put into service on Coastlink was an E400 with the licence plate YX63 LKN. Any E400s that were Coastlink branded were originally used by First Excel. The first Volvo B9TL was introduced on November 23rd of the same year, with the first actual bus being LK58 EDF.
