= Belton and Manthorpe =

Civil parish in Lincolnshire, England

Coordinates: 52.94°N 0.64°W

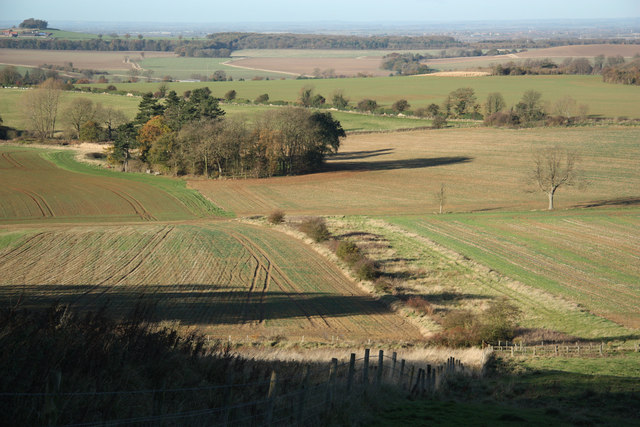
Quarry plantation on Barkston Heath

Belton and Manthorpe is a civil parish in the South Kesteven district of Lincolnshire, England, consisting of Belton and Manthorpe, just north of Grantham. According to the 2001 census it had a population of 517 in 192 households. By 2011 the authorities recorded 528 people in 216 homes.

The parish lies on either side of the River Witham, flowing northwards from Grantham to Lincoln, and is similarly bisected by the A607 road which follows the River closely through the parish. In 1852 the Great Northern Railway constructed its line between Grantham and Newark, which passes through the extreme west of the parish. This now forms part of the main East Coast Main Line from London to Edinburgh.

The Eastern part of the parish encloses the village of Belton, the park of Belton House, and that part of Barkston Heath not taken up by RAF Barkston Heath. The extreme eastern boundary is the former Roman road known as High Dyke, part of Ermine Street. On the West of the river Welland is the large Golf Course known as Belton Woods. In the extreme south is the village of Manthorpe, not to be confused with Grantham's Manthorpe Estate, adjacent to the southern boundary.

Both the villages were essentially agricultural estate villages constructed and maintained by the Brownlow family, until the 1950s.

== Terrain ==
The Geology of the parish is of Sedimentary Mudstone - the Charmouth Mudstone Formation - overlaid with postglacial sands and gravels. The bedrock of the higher ground at Barkston Heath is from the Great Oolite Group of sedimentary rocks - Sandstone and Limestone.

The parish is very approximately V-shaped from west to east. In the middle the river is at the 40 m contour. To the west the land is higher, around 90 m where the railway tunnel runs. To the east Barkston Heath is around 120 m above datum.
