= Swiss chalet style =

Architectural style originating from Central Europe

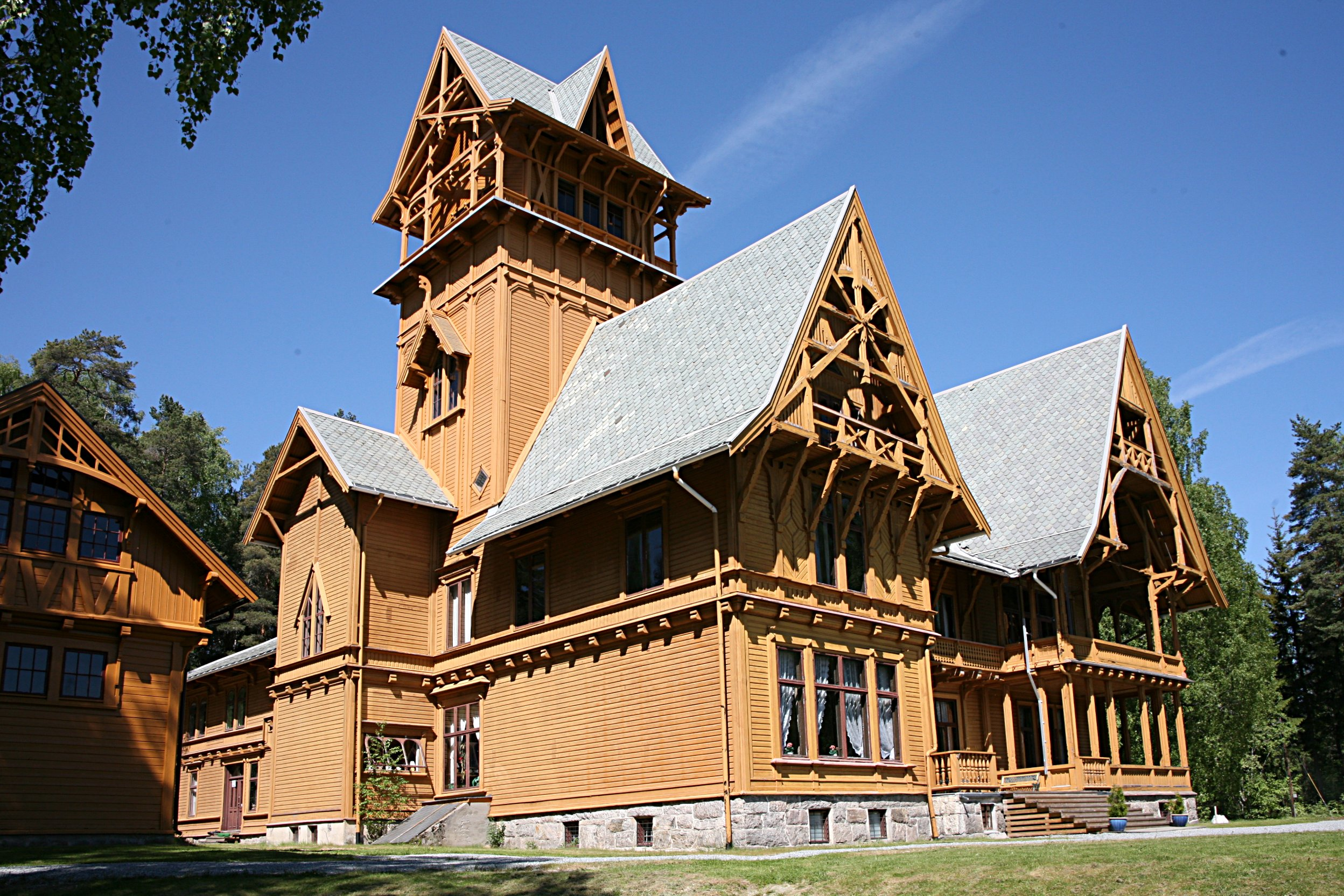
- Villa Fridheim in Krødsherad, Norway
- Location: Europe and North America

Swiss chalet style (German: Schweizerstil, Norwegian: sveitserstil) is an architectural style of Late Historicism, originally inspired by rural chalets in Switzerland and the Alpine (mountainous) regions of Central Europe. The style refers to traditional building designs characterised by widely projecting roofs and facades richly decorated with wooden balconies and carved ornaments. It spread over Germany, Austria-Hungary, Italy, France and Scandinavia during the Belle Époque era.

== History ==
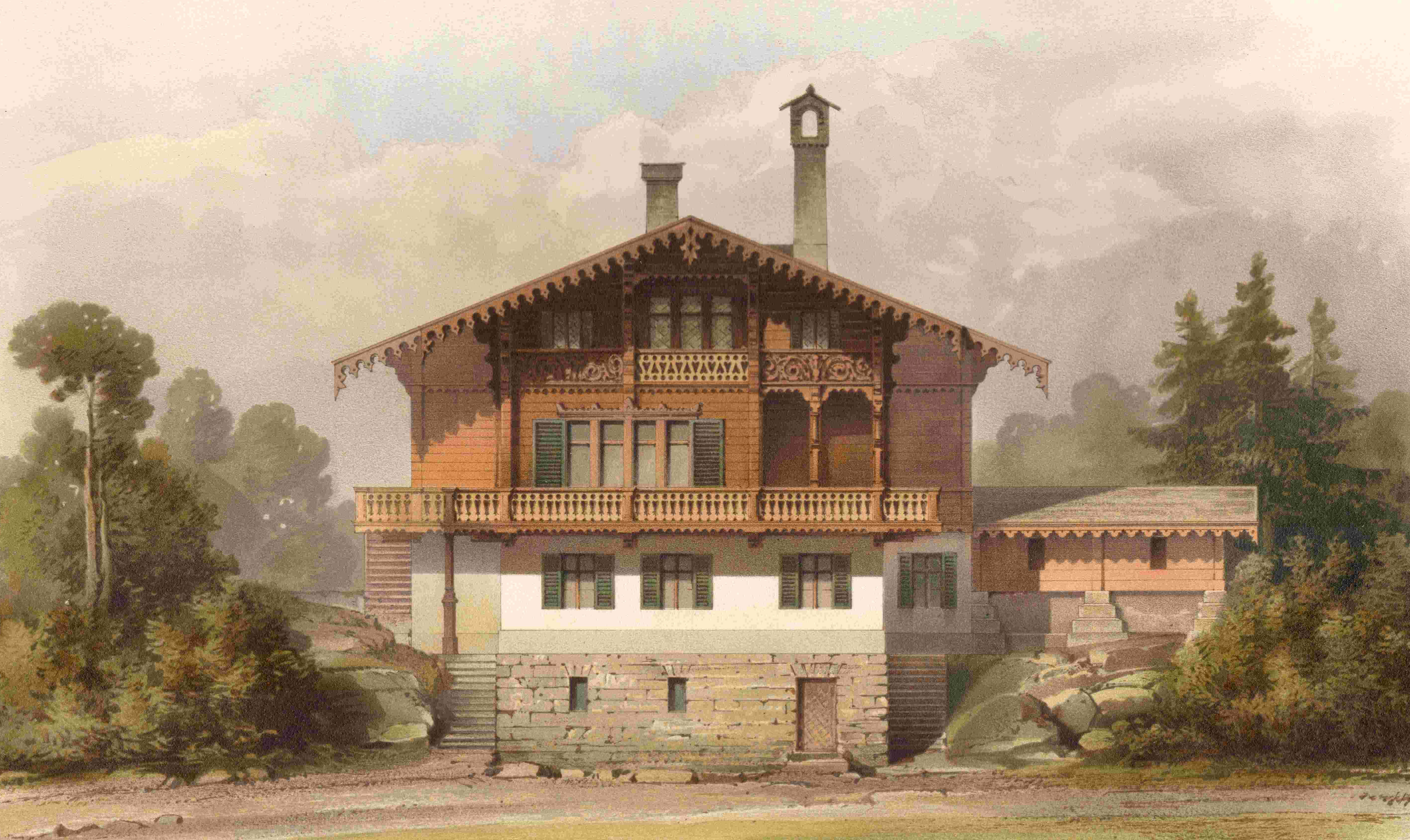
Schweizerhaus in Klein Glienicke near Berlin, designed by Ferdinand von Arnim, 1867

Swiss chalet style originated in the Romantic era of the late 18th and early 19th century, when the ideas of the English landscape garden inspired parks and residences in Germany, such as the Dessau-Wörlitz Garden Realm. It became highly appreciated on the continent by noble landowners who were impressed by the "simple life" of people living in the mountains.

The chalet style soon spread over the German Mittelgebirge landscapes such as the Harz mountains or the Dresden area and the adjacent North Bohemian region. As a "modern" building style, it also influenced the resort architecture along the Baltic seaside, like in Binz or Heringsdorf. Around 1900, design elements were used in the construction of numerous bourgeois family homes as well as by notable architects like Heinrich von Ferstel to build larger mansions and hotels.

The style was further popularized by the first waves of tourism of rich people from the North and West of Europe and became popular in other parts of Europe and North America, notably in the architecture of Norway, Iceland and the Netherlands and in the country house architecture of Sweden and Cincinnati (Ohio, US), in the late 19th and early 20th century. English examples of the chalet style include the Boathouse at Belton House, Lincolnshire, by Anthony Salvin and the Swiss Cottage at Osborne House, on the Isle of Wight, constructed for Queen Victoria's children.

== Characteristics ==
The style is characterized by:

- gabled roofs with wide eaves
- exposed construction beams, including large brackets
- decorative carving and mouldings
- balconies
- large windows
- weatherboarding, usually painted, often in bright colors

== Gallery ==
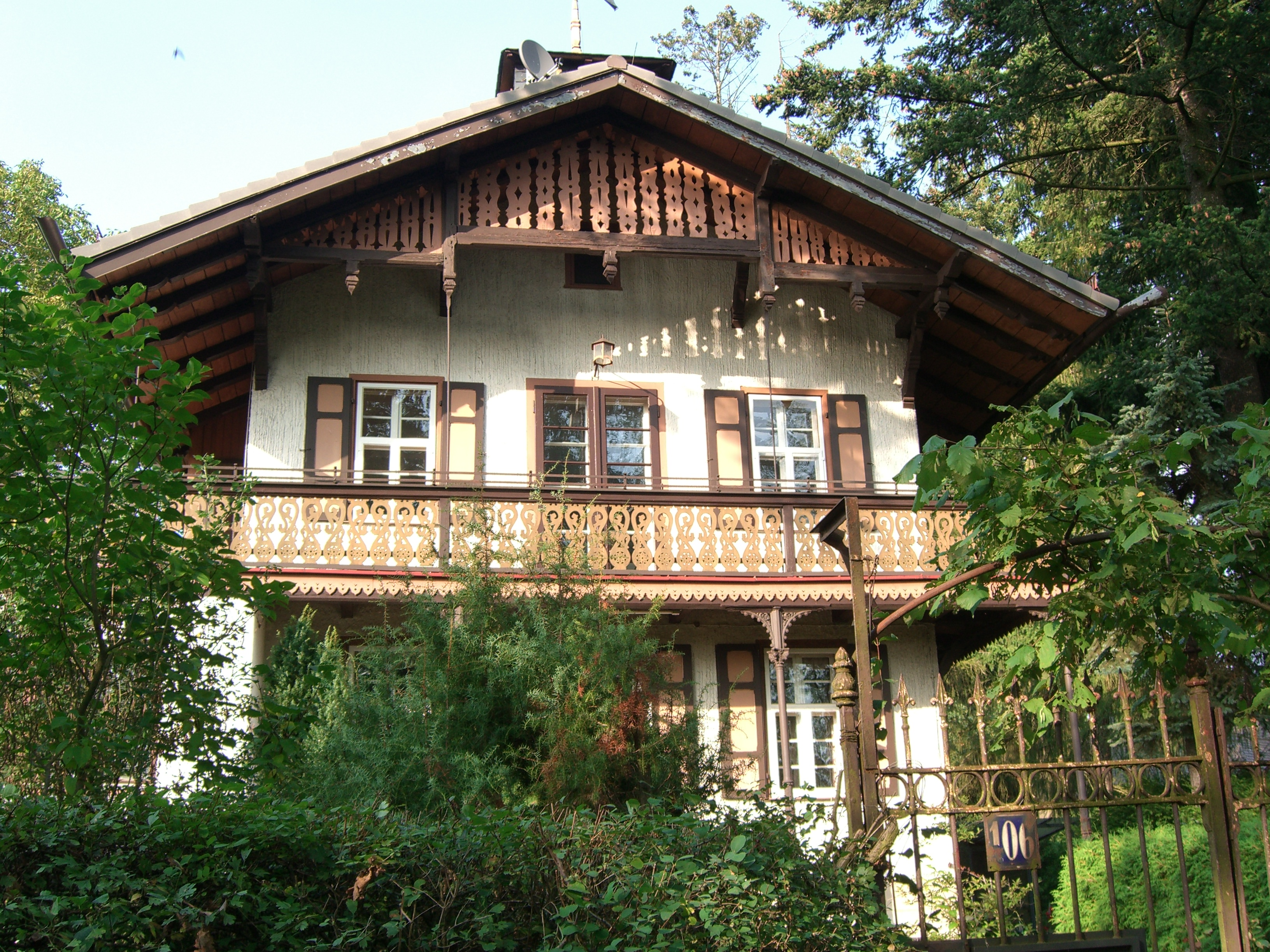
Villa in Erlangen

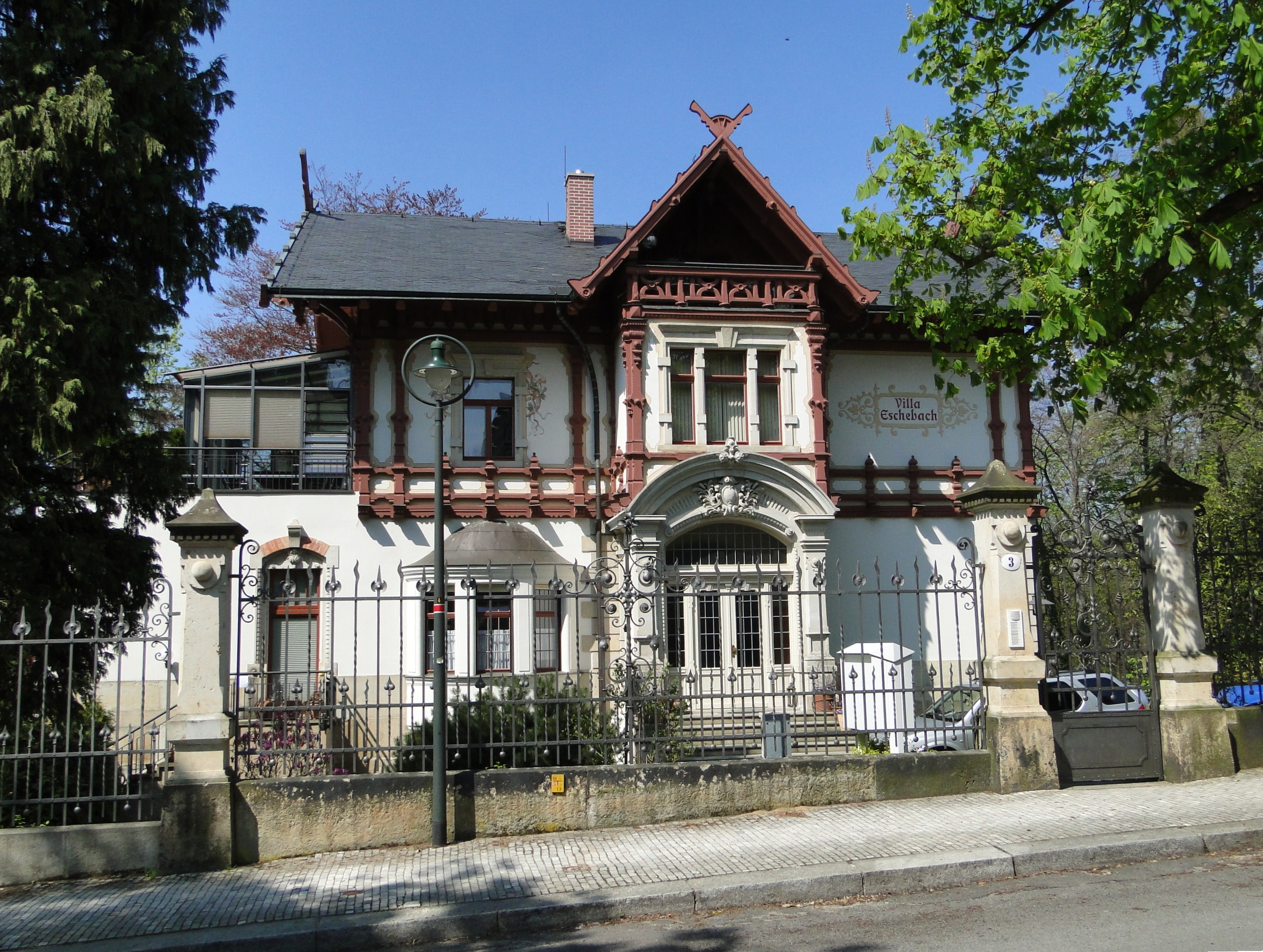
Villa Eschebach in Dresden

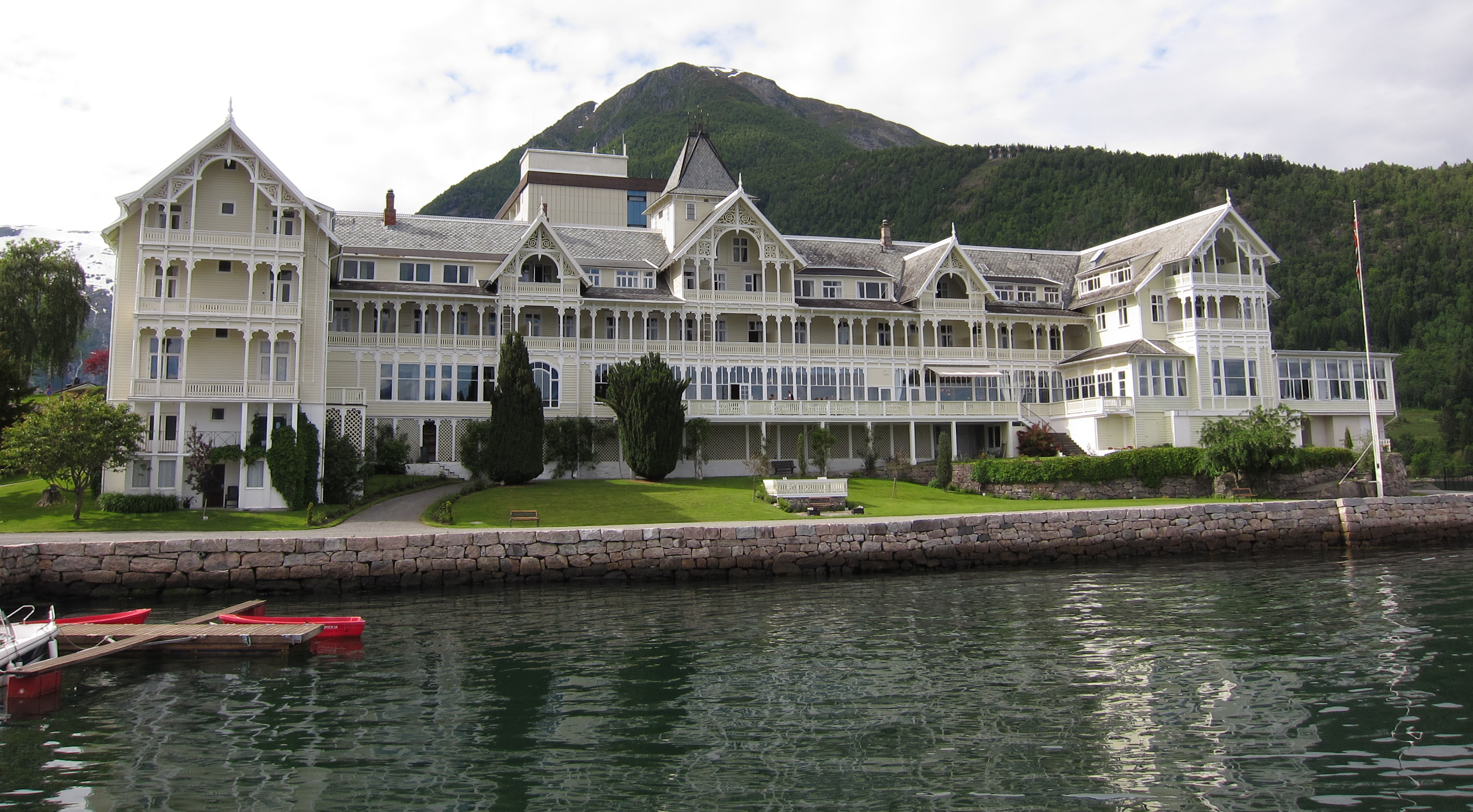
Kviknes Hotel in Balestrand, Norway, planned by Franz Wilhelm Schiertz in 1894

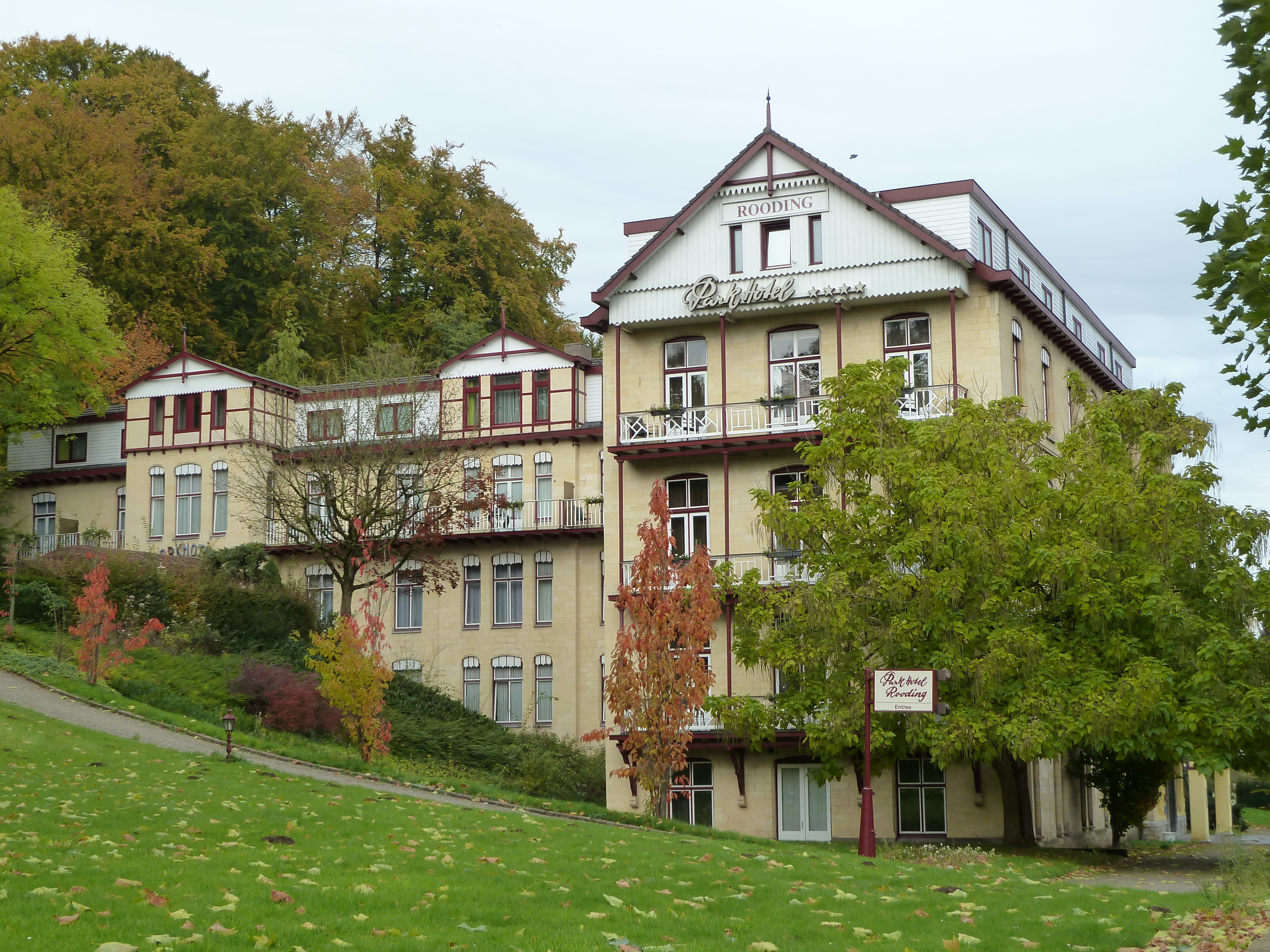
Hotel Rooding in Valkenburg, Netherlands (1892), designed by Pierre Cuypers

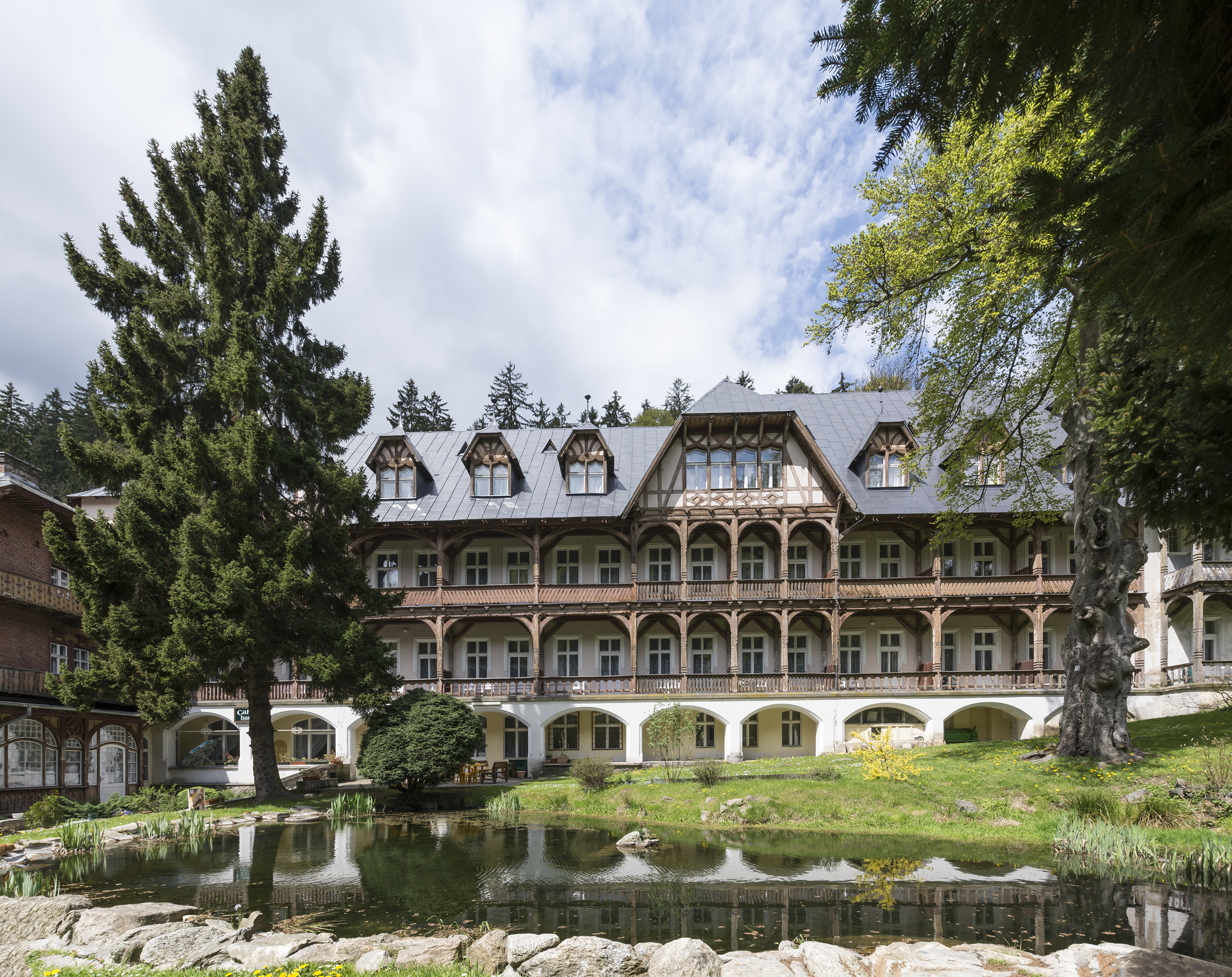
Sanatorium Gigant in Międzygórze, Poland

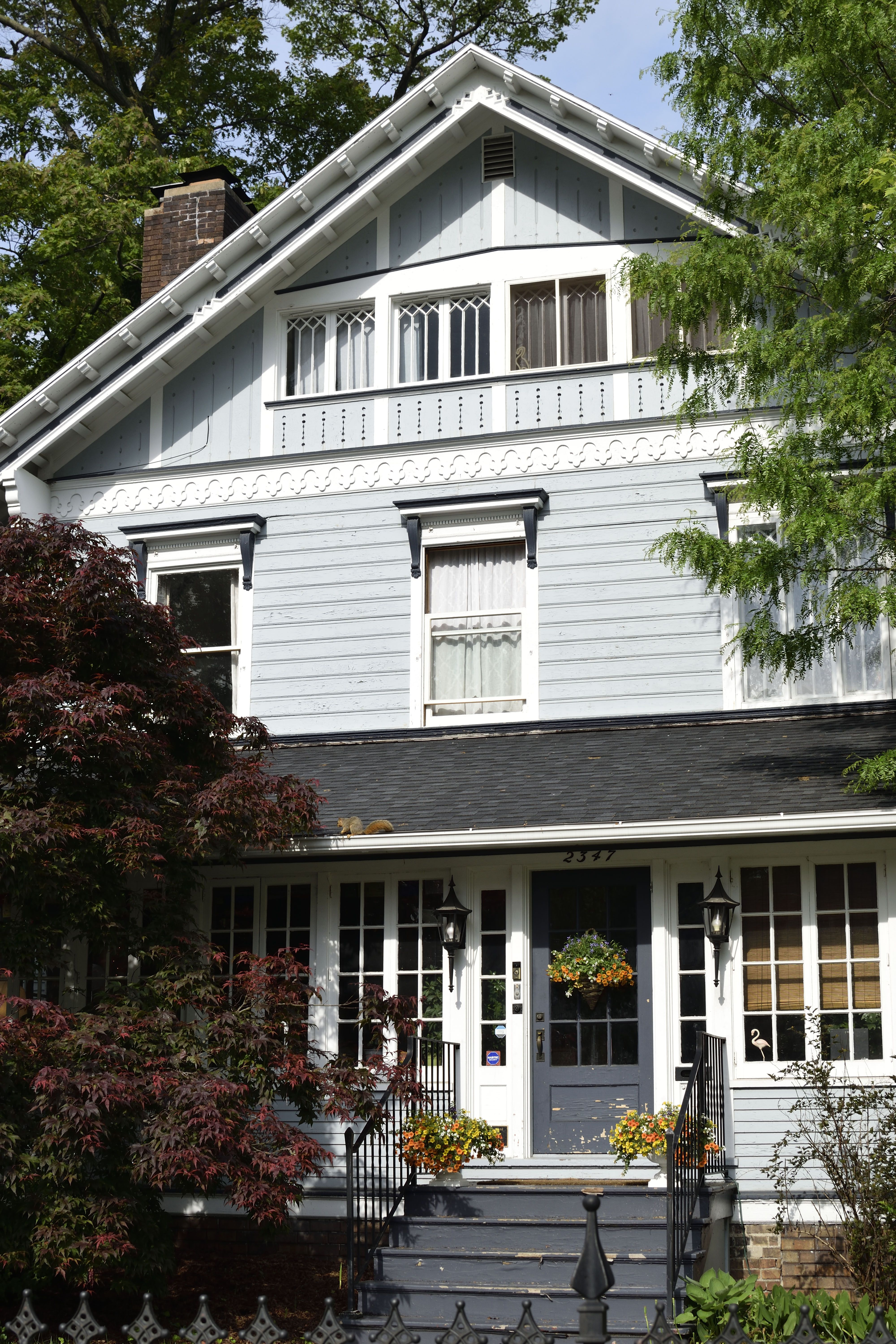
The Edwin J. Marshall Residence in Toledo, Ohio, designed by the Mills, Rhines, Bellman and Nordhoff architecture firm in 1912

== Swiss Chalet Revival ==
Swiss Chalet Revival architecture developed in the United States, emulating the original Swiss chalet style of Switzerland. The style was popular in the U.S. in the early 20th century, approximately coinciding with the Arts and Crafts era.

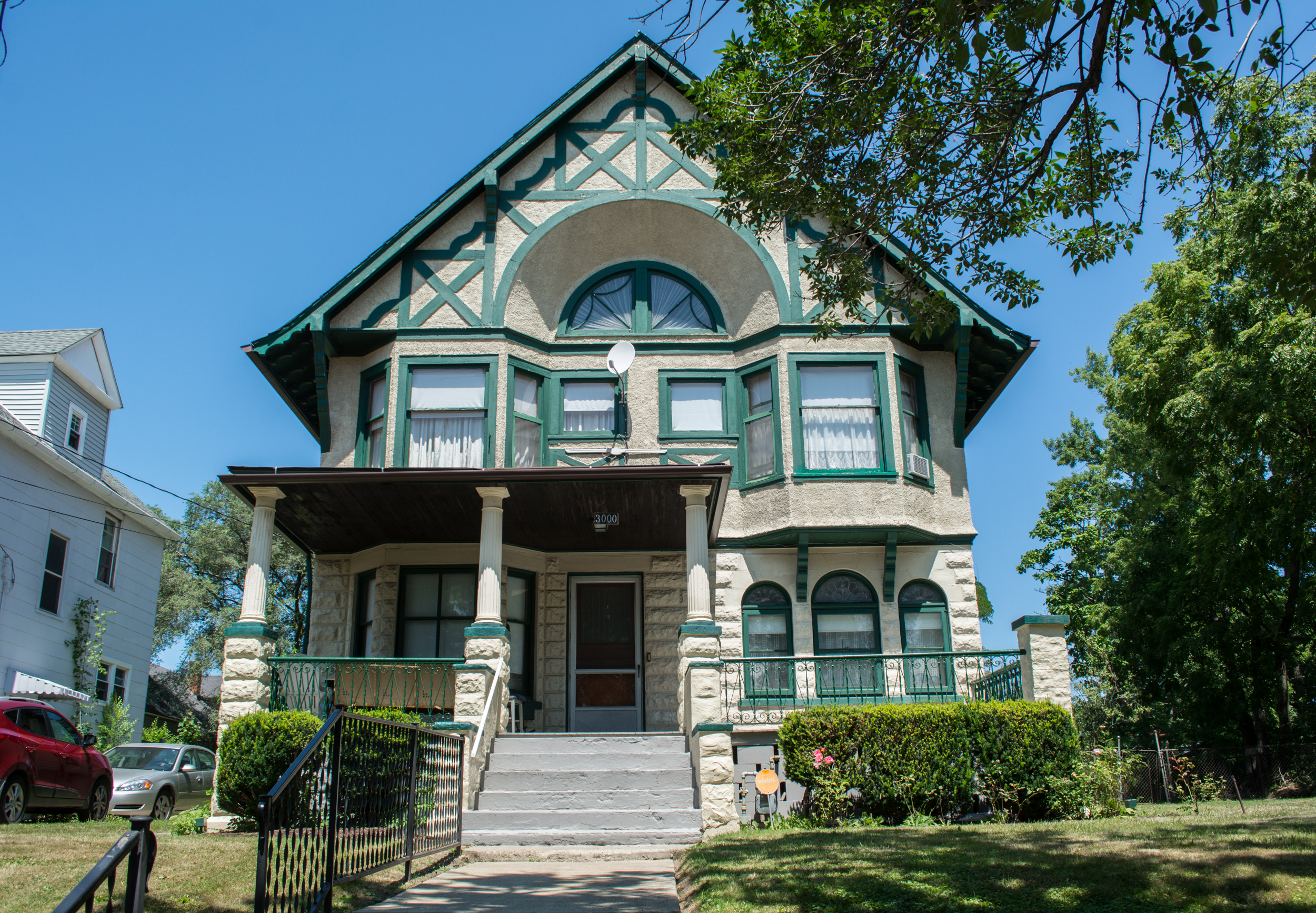
The Bomante House (1905) in Cleveland, Ohio, an example of Swiss Chalet Revival style

== See also ==
- Carpenter Gothic
- List of architectural styles
- Norvell House
- Style Sapin
- Timeline of architectural styles
- Victorian architecture
- Châteauesque
