= Bomante House =

Historic house in Ohio, United States

- U.S. National Register of Historic Places
- U.S. Historic district – Contributing property
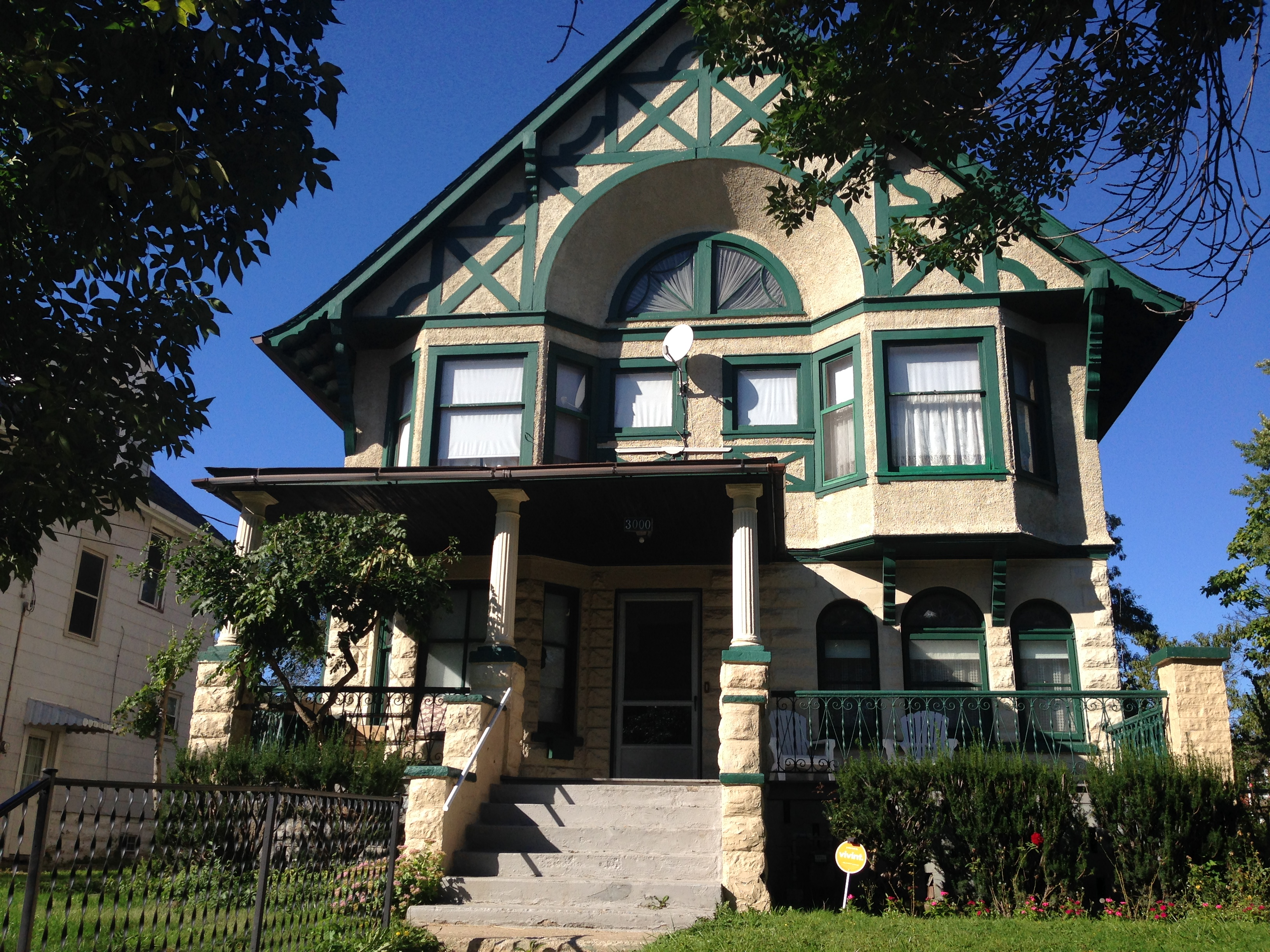
- The house's exterior in 2014

- Location within Cleveland Location within Ohio Location within the United States
- Location: 3000 Mapledale Avenue, Cleveland, Ohio, U.S.
- Coordinates: 41°27′17″N 81°42′09″W
- Built: 1905
- Architectural style: Swiss Chalet Revival
- Part of: Brooklyn Centre Historic District (ID99000238)
- NRHP reference No.: 87000441

Significant dates
- Added to NRHP: March 19, 1987
- Designated NRHP: March 19, 1987
- Designated CP: March 4, 1999

The Bomante House, also known as the Bomonti House, is a historic home located in Cleveland, Ohio, in the United States. Built in 1905 in the Swiss Chalet Revival, it exemplifies the architectural impact of one of Cleveland's largest immigrant communities.

== About the structure ==
Frederick W. Bomonti was born in Switzerland about 1864. He emigrated to the United States in 1882, and in 1883 joined Loew & Sons Co., a wholesale liquor business. In 1911, he opened a delicatessen in the Cleveland Arcade. It proved so popular that he later enlarged it into a restaurant which became one of the most famous in Cleveland. In 1916, Bomonti became a manager of Loew & Sons. He retired from the restaurant business in 1920 in favor of his son, Werner.

Bomonti was nationally known in Swiss American circles. For 10 years, he was national treasurer of the North American Swiss Alliance, a federation of 90 Swiss American benevolent societies.

The Bomonti House was built in 1905. The house is in the Swiss Chalet Revival style, as befitted Bomonti's ethnic heritage. The architect is not known. The state of Ohio was the top destination from 1870 to 1890 for Swiss emigrating to the United States, and Cleveland was one of the top cities in Ohio for Swiss to settle. The Bomonti House exemplifies the type of architecture preferred by this large and important ethnic group in Cleveland.

Martha "Fannie" Loew (née Bomonti), Frederick's sister, married into the Loew family and lived with Frederick Bomonti in the house after her husband died. She continued to live there after Frederick Bomonti's death in February 1941.
