= Belton House =

Country house in Belton near Grantham, Lincolnshire, England

Coordinates: 52.9431°N 0.6178°W

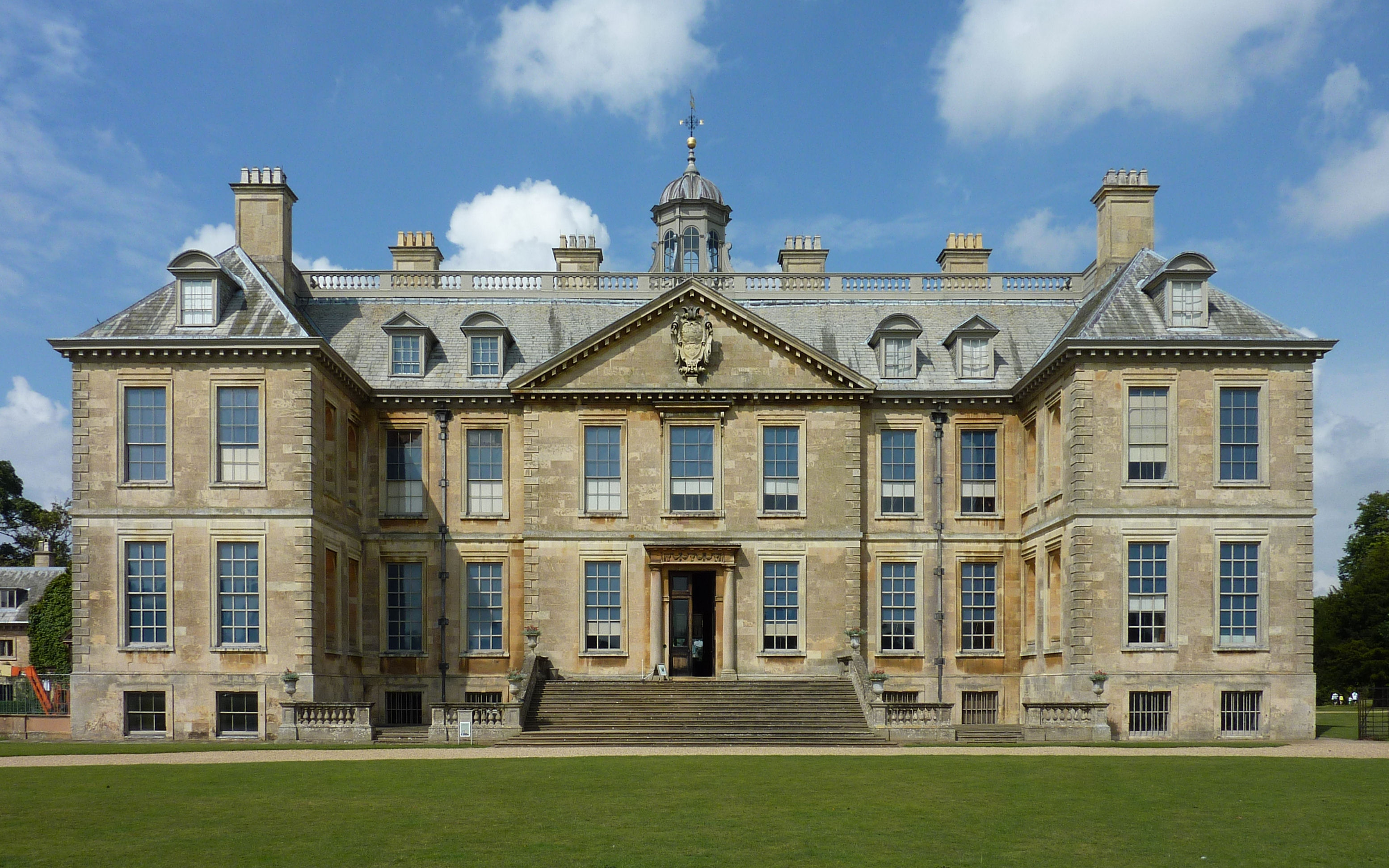
Belton House, south front

Belton House is a Grade I listed country house in the parish of Belton near Grantham in Lincolnshire, England, built between 1685 and 1687 by Sir John Brownlow, 3rd Baronet. It is surrounded by formal gardens and a series of avenues leading to follies within a larger wooded park. Belton has been described as a compilation of all that is finest of Carolean architecture, said to be the only truly vernacular style of architecture that England had produced since the Tudor period. It is considered to be a complete example of a typical English country house; the claim has even been made that Belton's principal façade was the inspiration for the modern British motorway signs which give directions to stately homes.

For about three centuries until 1984, Belton House was the seat of the Brownlow family, which had first acquired land in the area in the late 16th century. Their heirs, the Cust family, were created Baron Brownlow in 1776. Despite his great wealth Sir John Brownlow, 3rd Baronet, chose to build a comparatively modest house rather than one of the grand Baroque palaces being built by others at the time. The contemporary, if provincial, Carolean style was the selected choice of design. Nevertheless, the new house was fitted with the latest innovations, such as sash windows for the principal rooms, and followed the latest thinking on house-planning, in seeking to separate those parts of the building that were for the use of the family from the areas where servants carried out their domestic duties. Successive generations made changes to the interior of the house which reflected their changing social position and tastes, yet the fabric and design of the house changed little.

In August 1914, Belton House and its park were used as the assembly point for the newly-formed 11th (Northern) Division before its deployment in World War I, and in October 1915 it was used as the home depot and training ground of the Machine Gun Corps. During World War II, RAF Belton Park was established in the grounds of the house, as were two RAF Regiment squadrons, by November 1944 1,850 personnel were based at Belton.

The Custs, like many previously wealthy English families, were faced with mounting financial problems. Edward Cust, 7th Baron Brownlow opened the estate to the public. An adventure playground was built in the nearby woods to attract families to the house as a tourist attraction. However, the financial difficulties were too great and in 1984 they donated the house, with most of its contents, to the National Trust. The trust introduced new features and attractions to fund repairs and conservation. Further revenue is raised from the use of the property as a filming location, and from licensing the Marble Hall for civil weddings. It was visited by 419,982 people during 2024.

== History ==
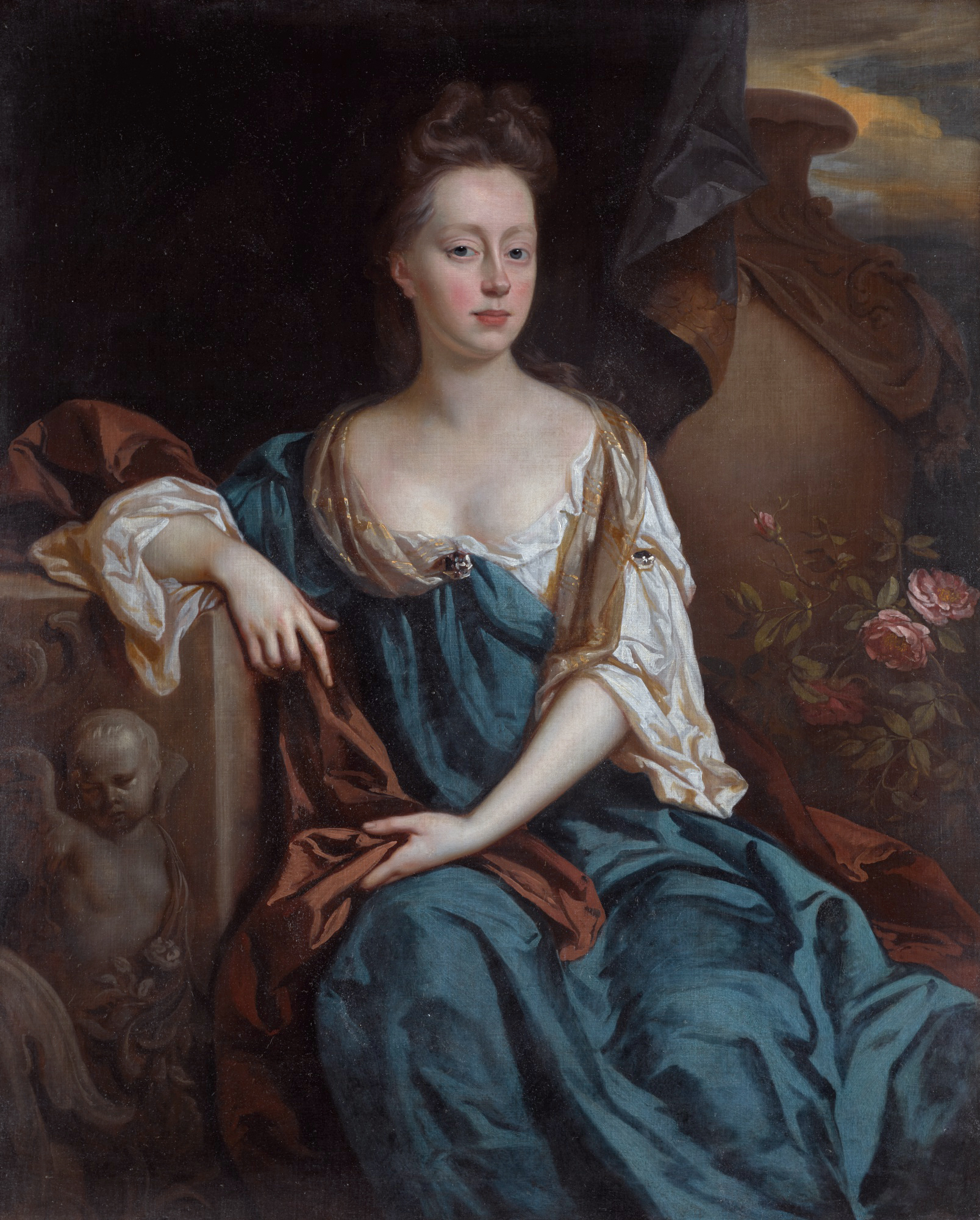
Portrait of Alice Brownlow, née Sherard, by John Riley

The Brownlow family, a dynasty of lawyers, began buying property in Lincolnshire to augment their income in 1598. Among these properties was the manor of Belton, 2 mi (3.2 km) distant from Grantham. Richard Brownlow, who established the family's wealth, began negotiations to acquire the manor from Sir Henry Pakenham in 1603 and secured its reversion to him six years later. The Pakenhams hosted King James I in the manor for a night in 1617. This occasion financially ruined the Pakenhams and led to the resignation of their interest in the property to Brownlow in exchange for a lifelong annuity. (Note: This annuity was paid until 1641, when Sir Henry Pakenham's wife, who survived him by 20 years, died.) Brownlow neither much stayed at nor made much change to the Belton manor, preferring to reside at other properties. When he died, Brownlow was succeeded by his son Sir John Brownlow, 1st Baronet, who himself died childless in 1679. John Brownlow had, however, become attached to two of his more distant blood relations: a great-nephew, also called John Brownlow, and a great-niece, Alice Sherard, who married in 1676 when both were aged 16.

After inheriting the estates of their great-uncle, Alice and John Brownlow sought to enter London high society. To that end, they bought a town house in the newly fashionable Southampton Square in Bloomsbury and decided to build a new country house at Belton to flaunt their wealth. In 1684 they acquired labourers and materials for the house, hiring brickmakers, bricklayers, and stonemasons, and carefully demolished the old manor, which stood near the present orangery, to recycle its components. The cornerstone of what became Belton House was laid on 23 March 1685 and its exterior was largely completed by the latter half of the following year. The interiors of the house were completed in 1687.

=== Private residence ===
The Brownlows moved into Belton House in November 1688. On 29 October 1695, they hosted William III, who was reported to have enjoyed his stay so much that he was too hung over to eat any of the food provided on his visit to Lincoln the following day. Two years later, in July 1697, Sir John Brownlow II committed suicide at a relative's residence in Dorset. Ownership of Belton House passed to his brother, William, who was content to permit Alice to remain in occupation until her death in 1721, and she spent that time arranging advantageous marriages for her five daughters. One of those marriages was between her youngest daughter, Eleanor, and Sir John Brownlow III, William's son. John III, made Viscount Tyrconnel in 1718, inherited Belton House on Alice's death and refurnished the house.

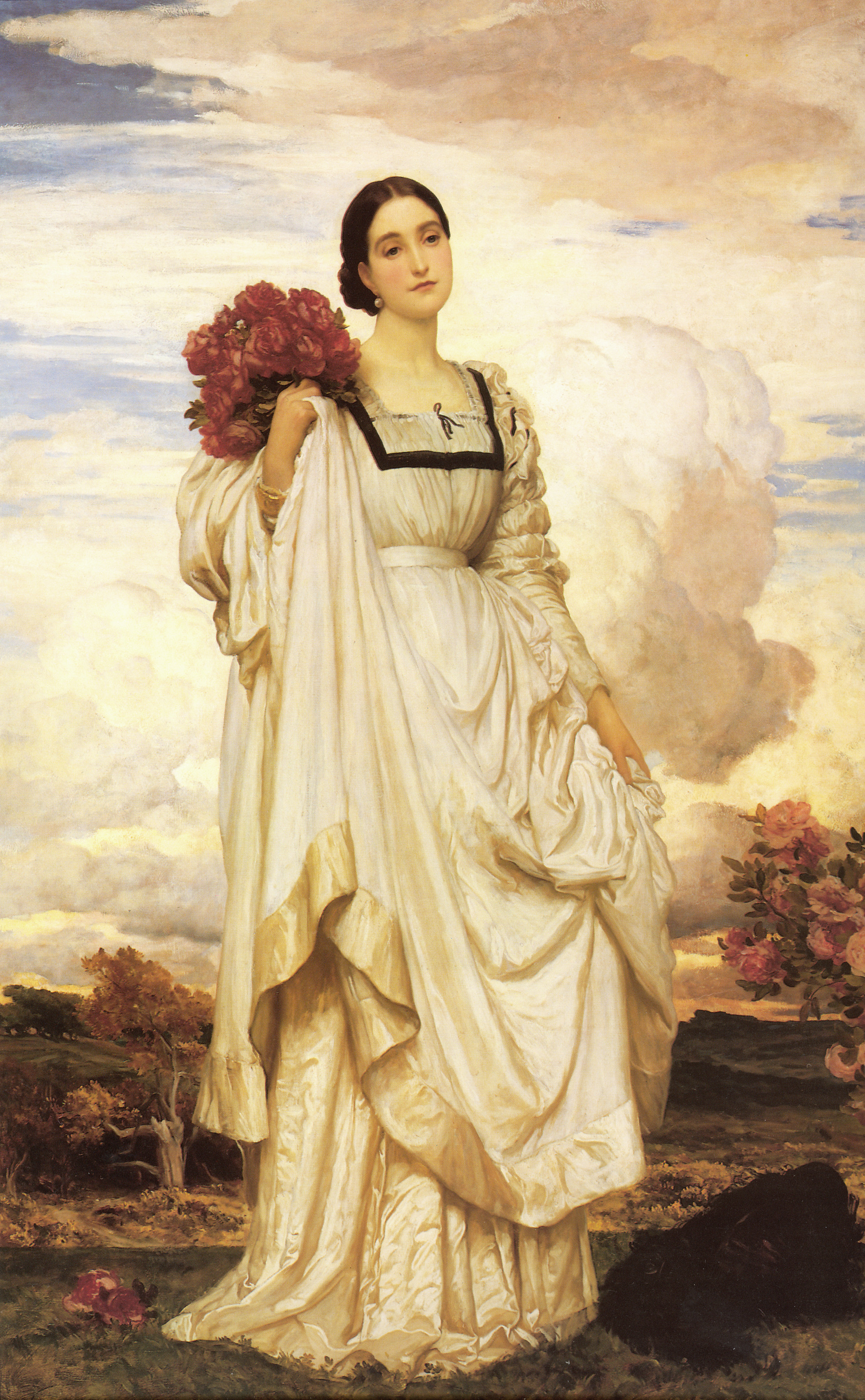
Adelaide, wife of the 3rd Earl Brownlow, in a portrait by Frederick Leighton

Sir John Brownlow III also died childless in 1754, and like Sir John Brownlow I focused his energies on a nephew, also named John, son of his sister Anne and Sir Richard Cust. The Cust family had family ties to the slave trade. (Note: The Custs' links to the slave trade were principally through John Cust's younger brother, Edward, whose wife, Mary Boode, came from a Dutch family with extensive slave plantations in the West Indies. On the passing of the Slavery Abolition Act 1833, the Cust brothers both received compensation for the loss of their slaves; John received some £5,000 as a trustee.) They moved into a house in Grantham and received the Viscount Tyrconnel's patronage. Upon John III's death, Anne inherited Belton House and lived in it until 1766, when she gave it to John Cust—elected MP for Grantham in 1743 and then Speaker of the House of Commons from 1761 to 1770—to provide him a residence befitting his political station. Cust died in 1770, because of the "unusual fatigues" of his office, according to his monument at Belton, and Belton passed to his son, Brownlow Cust, who was created Baron Brownlow in 1776.

Brownlow Cust made sweeping changes to Belton House. First, from 1770 to 1771, he arranged for repairs to its interiors and then hired architects James Wyatt and John Langworth to modernise the house over the rest of the century. In 1807, Brownlow Cust died and was succeeded by his son, John, created Earl Brownlow in 1815. The Earl also made changes to Belton House and its grounds, employing Jeffry Wyatville, James Wyatt's nephew, from 1809 to 1820 and Anthony Salvin in the 1830s. On his death in 1853 he was succeeded by a grandson, who himself died in 1867 leaving Belton House, and the manor and estate of Ashridge in Hertfordshire, inherited in 1849 by the 1st Earl's oldest son, John Egerton, Viscount Alford, to another grandson, Adelbert Brownlow-Cust, 3rd Earl Brownlow.

Although the 3rd Earl preferred to live at Ashridge or at Carlton House Terrace in London, he spent the rest of the 19th century reverting Belton House to its 17th-century appearance. The house entered the 20th century in a good state of repair and preservation, but that century was to present Belton and its estate with serious problems. In January 1921, the 3rd Earl died childless. As a consequence, his title became extinct and his estates were inherited by Adelbert Salusbury Cockayne-Cust, 5th Baron Brownlow. The diminishing value of the family's land and death duties for the 3rd Earl obliged the 5th Baron to sell Ashridge and its art collections. Further death duties were incurred on Adelbert's death in 1927, who passed the house to his son, Peregrine. The 6th Lord Brownlow was involved in the 1936 abdication of Edward VIII as his Lord-in-waiting. Edward VIII, who became the Duke of Windsor after the abdication, visited Belton in the 1930s with his mistress Wallis Simpson, whom Brownlow tried in vain to persuade to stay at Belton House in the course of the crisis.

=== Belton House and the World Wars ===
Belton Park held temporary encampments for the training of British Army units for many years before the start of World War I, but had never held any permanent facilities. At the beginning of the war, like many other British landowners, the 3rd Earl Brownlow offered the house and grounds of Belton and Ashridge to the Government for war service. The offer was accepted and in August 1914, Belton House and its park were used as the assembly point for the newly-formed 11th (Northern) Division before its deployment. A small town was erected on the Belton estate for the soldiers by April 1915 and included such amenities as a YMCA, a cinema and its own railway line. In October 1915, the home depot and training ground of the Machine Gun Corps were established in the southern part of Belton park. By 1922, the camp had closed and all the military buildings had been demolished. An archaeological dig at the site was undertaken by the Time Team in 2012.

The years following World War I were severely testing for the owners of many great estates. Both indoor and outdoor staff had previously been plentiful, essential, and cheap, but were now in short supply. Millions of men had left private service to join the army, and very few returned. Female domestic staff had been called up for war service in factories, and now realised there was an easier and better paid existence outside the great country houses.

Belton again saw war service during World War II. In March 1942 the depot for the RAF Regiment was established at the park as RAF Belton Park. It was housed in Nissen huts. Alongside the depot, Belton Park also held the RAF Regiment Officer Cadet Training Unit (OCTU) which provided officers with the professional skills necessary for service in the regiment. Two RAF Regiment squadrons were formed at Belton Park in 1942; 2788 Field Squadron in March and 2774 Field Squadron in May. By November 1944 1,850 personnel were based at Belton. When the war ended in the following year the RAF Regiment was reorganised and Belton Park became No. 1 Depot, continuing on as the OCTU. The RAF Regiment left Belton in August 1946, closing its depots and sub-depots in Lincolnshire.

=== National Trust ===
Following the wars, many thousands of country houses of great architectural value were demolished, or had whole wings razed to the ground. In 1955 alone one house was demolished every five days. In this respect Belton was fortunate to survive at all, as in addition to the family's problems, the house deteriorated to such an extent that in 1961 the 6th Baron employed the architect Francis Johnson to oversee a restoration program lasting three years. The roof was replaced, much of the panelling taken down and repaired, and new cornices installed. Attempts were also made to curtail serious infestations of dry rot. In the previous decade, Belton was designated a Grade I listed building, the highest possible grade reserved for structures of exceptional interest. Gervase Jackson-Stops, the architectural historian suggests, in his 1990 study The Country House in Perspective, that the main façade of the house was the inspiration for the British motorway signs which indicate the proximity of stately homes.

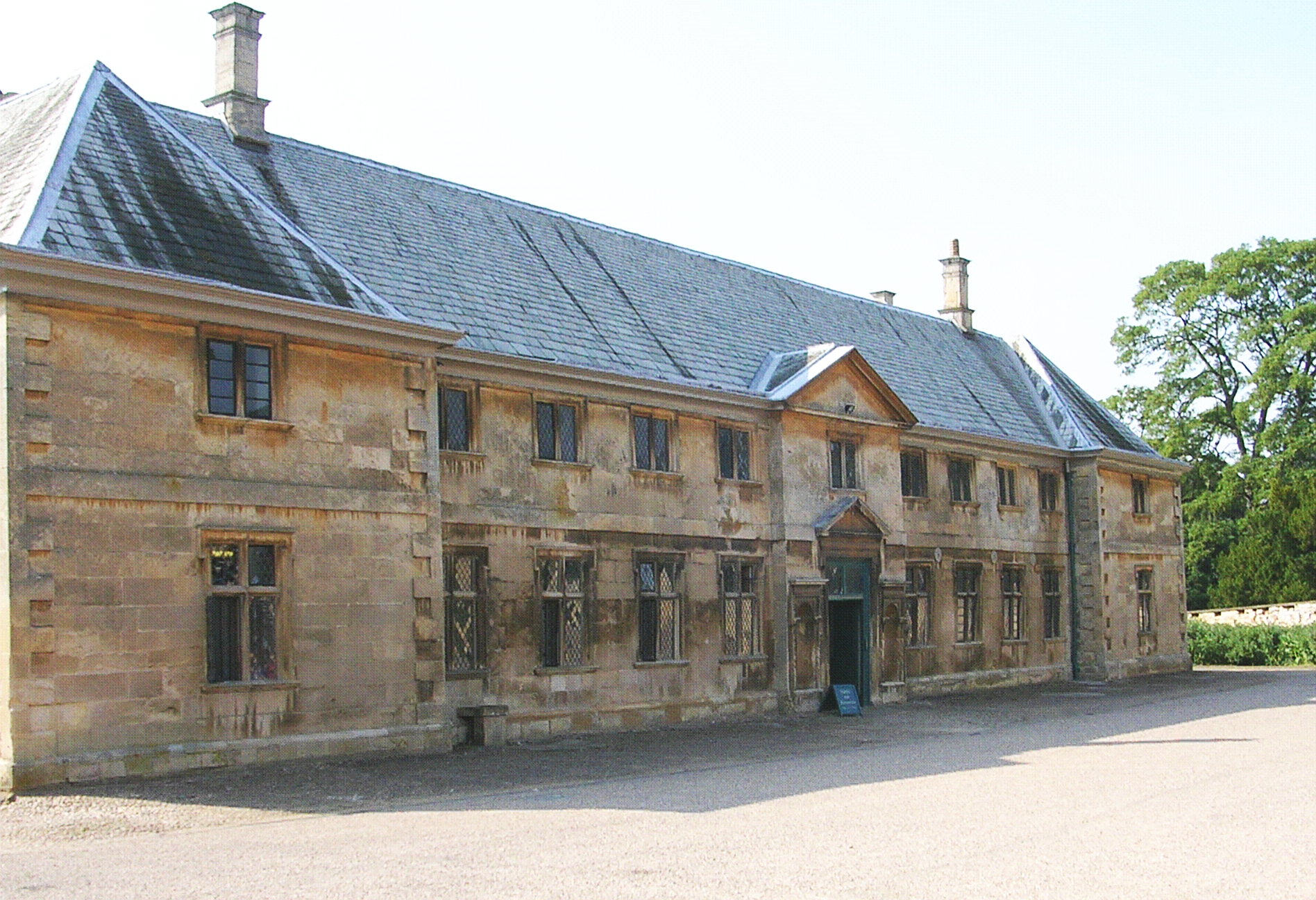
The stables, restored by the Trust in 2016 as the restaurant

The seventh Baron attempted to retain the house and estate by opening to the public. An adventure playground was built in the nearby woods to attract families to the house as a tourist attraction. However, the financial difficulties were too great and in January 1984 he transferred ownership of the house, garden, and some of the contents to the National Trust, a charitable body experienced in the management of historic properties. An auction of the contents was held at Belton House by Christie's over three days 30 April – 2 May 1984, comprising 1,022 lots. The National Trust then purchased 1,317 acres (5.33 km^{2}; 533 ha) of parkland and much of the remaining contents at a cost of £8 million (worth about £26 million today) with a grant from the National Heritage Memorial Fund. (Note: The contents, comprising just under 20,000 items of art, antiques, silver and other artefacts, represented some four hundred years of collecting by the Brownlow family. A modern example is a portrait by the African-American artist Richmond Barthé, bought by the 6th Earl, who had a holiday home in Jamaica when Barthé was resident on the island. The sitter has recently been identified as Lucian Levers.)

A priority for the Trust on their taking over Belton was the establishment of a restaurant, to augment the estate's income, and encourage people to spend more time at Belton and travel greater distances to visit. (Note: Following a major restoration begun in 2016, the restaurant is now housed in William Stanton's stable block, one of only twenty-one Grade I listed stables in England.) Though the house, its contents, and outbuildings were in an adequate state of repair at the time of the gift, they have since become part of an ongoing programme of conservation and restoration. At the same time, the National Trust has introduced new features and attractions such as a silver exhibition that displays a collection of silver amassed by the Brownlow family, dating from 1698. Further revenue is raised from the use of the property as a filming location, and from licensing the Marble Hall for civil weddings. The house has featured in the 1988 TV adaptation of the 1987 children's novel Moondial; as "Rosings Park" in the BBC's 1995 television version of Pride and Prejudice. and in the Netflix series Bridgerton. It was visited by 419,982 people during 2024.

== Architecture ==
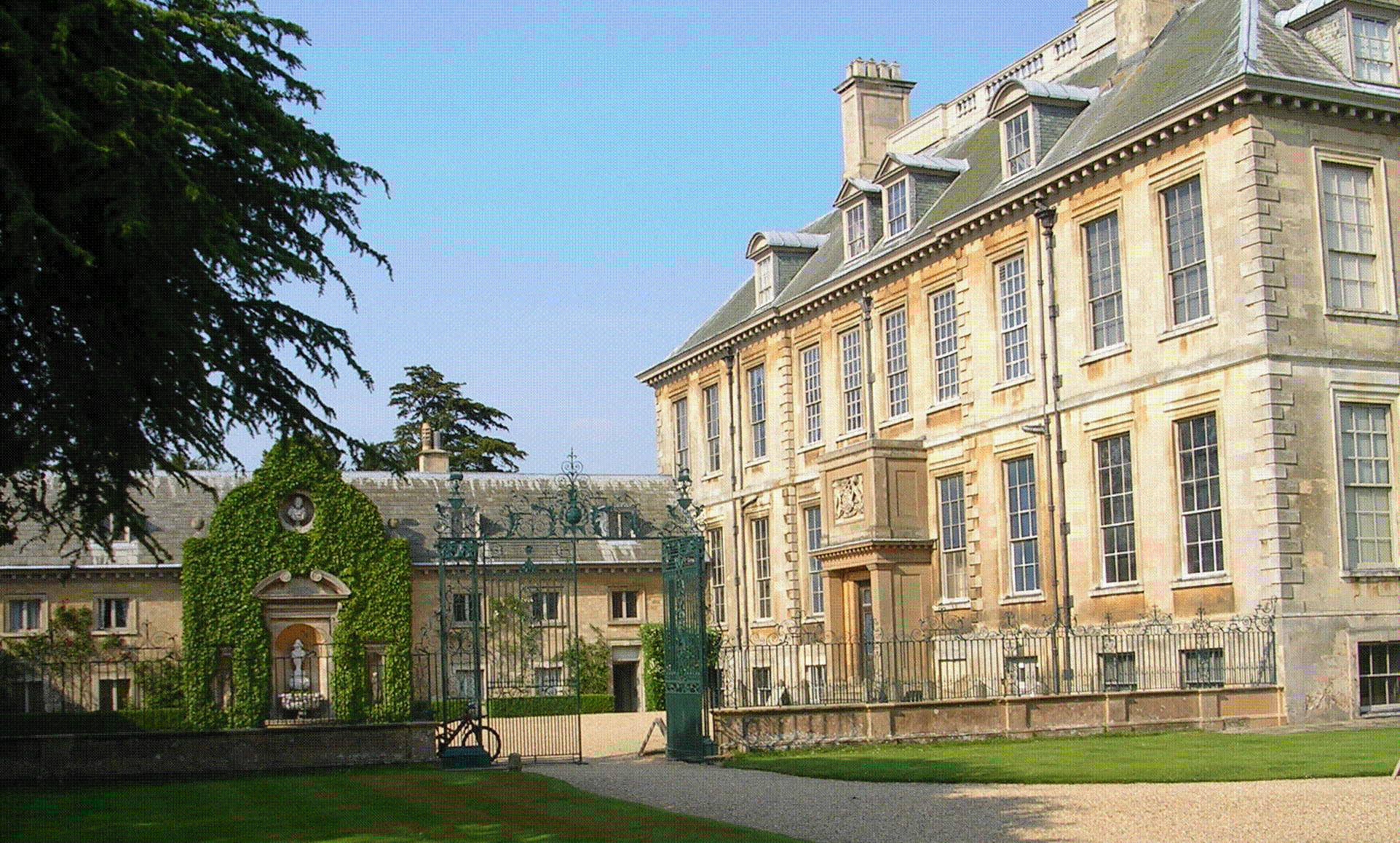
West façade. Many of the windows are false and are so placed as to provide symmetry. The Baroque wrought-iron gate screen closes a courtyard between house and stables, thus creating the effect of a cour d'honneur to the house's west entrance.

Nikolaus Pevsner described Belton as "a house of fulfillment rather than innovation" while Nigel Nicolson called it "a summing-up of all that is best in the only truly vernacular [architectural] style in England since the late Tudors." Belton is a scaled-down version of Clarendon House, designed and constructed by Roger Pratt and demolished in 1683, which was considered by the architectural historian Sir John Summerson to be "the most influential house of its time among those who aimed at the grand manner". Following that example, Belton House was constructed with two storeys set over a semi-basement and with service wings, creating an H-shaped building two rooms deep and with pediments above the central façade on both sides. Belton House's exterior was constructed from 1,750,000 bricks, faced with Ancaster stone from a quarry at Heydour in Lincolnshire and a lighter ashlar from Ketton for the quoining. Neoclassical embellishments were added onto the façade by James Wyatt in 1777–78.

The second floor has a complementary fenestration, with windows matching those on the first floor below. The very latest innovation, sash windows, was used on both floors. (Note: Sash windows had first been used on a grand scale at Chatsworth House in the late 1670s but not become popular until installed at Whitehall Palace in 1685, while Belton was under construction.) The semi-basement and attic storey used the more old-fashioned mullioned and transomed windows, indicating the lower status of the occupants of these floors. It was clearly emphasised from without that the two main floors of the house were for state and family use, and the staff and service areas were confined to the semi-basement and attic floors. This concept of keeping staff and domestic matters out of sight (when not required) was relatively new and had first been employed by Pratt in the design of Coleshill House in Berkshire. The contemporary social commentator Roger North lauded back stairs, of which Belton has two examples (5 and 14 on plan), as one of the most important inventions of his day.

It is not known for certain who designed Belton House, but the architect now generally considered responsible for its design is William Winde. The house had previously been attributed to Sir Christopher Wren, and it has also been suggested, based on the house's similarity to Clarendon House, that Belton could have been designed by any competent draughtsman. The assumption that Winde was the architect is based on the stylistic similarity between Belton and Coombe Abbey, which was remodelled by Winde between 1682 and 1685. That Winde was the architect is further evidenced by his connections to several of the artisans who worked at Belton. In a letter dated 1690, Winde recommends a plasterer to another of his patrons based on his work at Coombe Abbey, Hampstead Marshall, and Belton, and he had previously worked with the carpenter Edward Willcox, who supplied the cupola.

John and Alice Brownlow assembled one of the finest teams of craftsmen available at the time to work on the project. This was headed by the master mason William Stanton who oversaw the project and undertook work independently, for example the service wing. His second in command, John Thompson, had worked with Sir Christopher Wren on several of the latter's London churches, while the chief joiner John Sturges had worked at Chatsworth House under William Talman. The wrought-ironworker John Warren worked under Stanton at Denham Place, Buckinghamshire, and the fine wrought iron gates and overthrow at Belton may be his. Thus, so competent were the builders of Belton that Winde may have done little more than provide the original plans and drawings, leaving the interpretation to the on-site craftsmen. This theory is further demonstrated by the external appearance of the adjoining stable block. More provincial, and less masterful in proportion, it is known to have been entirely the work of Stanton.

=== Interiors ===
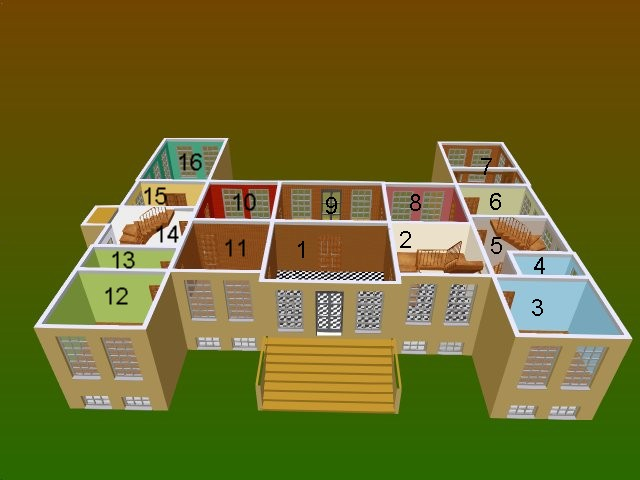
Unscaled plan of Belton House's piano nobile. 1: Marble Hall; 2: Great Staircase; 3: Bedchamber, now Blue Room; 4: Sweetmeat closet; 5: Back stairs & east entrance; 6: Chapel Drawing Room; 7: Chapel (double height); 8: Tyrconnel Room; 9: Saloon; 10: Red Drawing Room; 11: Little Parlour (now Tapestry Room); 12: School Room; 13: Closet; 14: Back stairs & west entrance; 15: Service Room (now Breakfast Room); 16: Upper storey of kitchen, (now Hondecoeter Room)

The plan of the rooms at Belton was outdated for a grand house of its time. Following the Stuart Restoration of 1660 and the influx of European ideas, it had become popular for large houses to follow the continental fashion of a suite of state rooms consisting of a withdrawing room, dressing room, and bedroom proceeding from either side of a central saloon or hall. These rooms were permanently reserved for use by a high ranking guest, such as a visiting monarch. While Belton does have a saloon at its centre, enfilades of state rooms of lessening grandeur do not flank it. This may have been due to the Brownlows' status as gentry, albeit wealthy, rather than aristocracy. When William III stayed at Belton House, he occupied the "Best bedchamber", a large room with an adjoining closet, directly above the saloon, that led directly from the second floor Great Dining Chamber.

This design followed the older style of having reception rooms and bedrooms scattered over the two main floors. The layout used followed Roger Pratt's theory that guest and family rooms should be quite separate. As a consequence of this philosophy, the family occupied the rooms on the first and second floors of the west and east wings, with the state rooms in the centre. The great staircase, designed to be grand and imposing, rose to the east side of the house, and formed part of the guest's state route from the Hall and Saloon on the first floor to the dining room and bedroom on the second.

The main entrance hall, reception and family bedrooms were placed on the ground and first floors above a low semi-basement containing service rooms. The two major entrances to the mansion in the centre of both the north and south facades were accessed by external staircases, originally a single flared flight on the north side and a double staircase on the south, each of which have since been replaced by single broad flights of steps. (Note: Compare original blueprints and old depictions of the hall (e.g. Tinniswood (1992), 11, 22, 72) with current designs.)

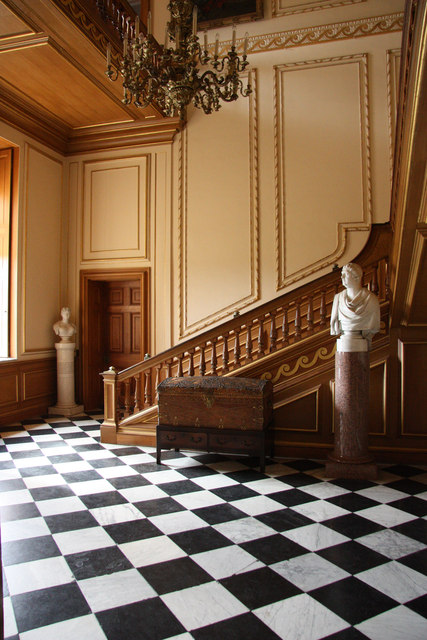
The Great Staircase, previously known as the "Little Marble Hall"

The principal room is the large Marble Hall (1) at the centre of the south front; this hall is the beginning of a grand procession of rooms, and corresponds to the former Great Parlour or Saloon (9) on the north front. The Marble Hall is flanked by the former Little Parlour (11, now the Tapestry Room) and the Great Staircase (2), while the Saloon is flanked by two withdrawing rooms (8, 10). The bedrooms are arranged in individual suites on both floors of the two wings (3, etc.) that flank the state centre of the house. The main staircase, set to one side of the Marble Hall, is one of the few things at Belton which is asymmetrically placed. It has a robust plaster-work ceiling incorporating the Brownlow crest by the London plasterer Edward Goudge, "now looked on as ye best master in England in his profession," William Winde reported in 1690. (Note: Winde to Lady Mary Bridgeman, 8 February 1690, noted by Beard, 221 and Tinniswood (1992), 9.)

Bodily and spiritual needs were balanced symmetrically within the mansion: the kitchen (16) and the chapel (7) were both large two-storied halls, rising from the semi-basement to the first floor. This design not only provided a great and lofty space, but also allowed the servants to worship in the chapel without leaving the service floor, while their employers would worship from a private gallery, complete with fireplace, overlooking the chapel on the first floor. The chapel has a notable ceiling undertaken by Goodge, and an elaborate reredos.

One of the most Carolean features of the house is the balustrade and cupola surmounting the roof, another element introduced to English architecture by Roger Pratt. The cupola at Belton does not light a lofty domed hall, as is often the case in Europe, but houses a staircase which gives access to a large viewing platform on top of a lead roof, concealed from the ground by the balustrade which tops the more conventional and visible hipped roof. From this vantage point, the owners of Belton could admire the perfect symmetry of their avenues and formal gardens spreading from the house. This feature of the house was removed by the architect James Wyatt when he modernised the house in the 18th century. It was restored to its original form in the 1870s by the 3rd Earl Brownlow.

Some of Belton's many rooms have been altered over the last 300 years both in use and design. The Marble Hall (1), the first of the large reception rooms, serves as an entrance hall from the south entrance, and takes its name from a chequer board patterned floor of black and white marble tiles. By the time of Belton's conception, the great hall was no longer a place for the household to eat, but intended as a grand entrance to the house. The hall was originally hung with 28 portraits of Kings, Queens, and Emperors, from William the Conqueror to William III, intended to give the house an air of dynastic importance. The less numerous and far newer Brownlow family portraits were originally hung in the Great Dining Room immediately above. The room is fully panelled, and parts of the panelling contain lime wood embellishments attributed to Grinling Gibbons. In the early 19th century, this room, and some others, were re-modelled by Jeffry Wyatville, who in addition to graining and painting the panelling to imitate oak installed new doors.

The Saloon (9), opens from the Marble Hall. This large panelled room is on an axis to the avenues of the formal north gardens. Originally known as the Great Parlour, this has always been the chief reception room of the house. It retains its original marble fireplace and has an ornate plaster ceiling which is a Victorian copy of the original ceiling by Goudge. The centrepiece of the room is a large Aubusson carpet made in 1839 for the 1st Earl Brownlow.

Either side of the Saloon are two smaller drawing rooms (8, 10), which would originally have served as private withdrawing rooms from the more public activities which would have taken place in the Marble Hall and Saloon. One of these rooms, now called the Tyrconnel Room (10), was transformed into the state bedroom during the occupancy of Lord Tyrconnel in an attempt to create a more fashionable suite of Baroque state rooms on the first floor. After his death in 1754, it became a Billiard Room, until the 3rd Earl Brownlow had it refurnished more than a century later. Unusually, the floor is painted with the family arms and crest. The date of the floor is not known for certain but the early nineteenth century has been suggested.

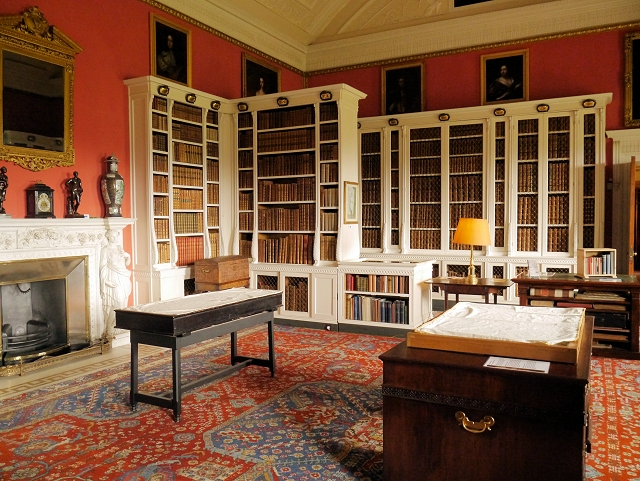
The library

The final large reception room on the first floor is the Hondecoeter Room (16), so named because of the three huge oil paintings by Melchior d'Hondecoeter (1636–1695), depicting scenes of birds in courtyards, which are fitted into the neo-Carolean panelling. The panelling was introduced to the room by the 3rd Earl Brownlow in 1876, when it was furnished as the principal dining room of the mansion. The room was initially created as a library in 1808 from the upper part of the earlier kitchen which had originally risen two stories. The West staircase (14) was originally a service stairs, and would have been plainer in decor, but by the late nineteenth century it was in regular use by the family.

Either side of the Marble Hall, lie the Great Staircase (2) and the Tapestry Room (11), which contains a collection of early eighteenth century Mortlake tapestries. The placing of the Great Staircase to the east of the Marble Hall is unusual, in that houses of this period usually put the staircase in the hall. The stairs rise in three flights around the west, north, and east walls to the former Great Dining Room above the Marble Hall. Thus the staircase served as a processional route between the three main reception rooms of the house. The Great Dining Room has been greatly altered and all traces of Carolean decoration removed. Originally a parlour, in 1778 James Wyatt transformed it into a drawing room with a vaulted ceiling; in 1876, its use was again changed, this time to a library. The room contains some 6000 volumes, a superb example of book collecting over 350 years. The Custs' passion for book collecting saw the original library on the ground floor, formerly a schoolroom, become too small for their needs and Wyatt created a new one in the early 1800s. This was itself replaced when the Great Dining Room was converted. When Lord Tyrconnel died in 1754 a catalogue of his library identified almost 2,300 books. (Note: Abigail Brundin and Dunstan Roberts, in their article, Book-Buying and the Grand Tour: the Italian Books at Belton House in Lincolnshire, make the point, following Mark Purcell, that country house libraries often had a much wider readership than the immediate family, including relatives, friends, neighbours and household staff.) Almost all of these remain in the Belton library today. (Note: The library at Belton today houses the second largest collection of books held by the National Trust.) Rupert Gunnis attributed the carved marble chimneypiece depicting two Roman goddesses to Sir Richard Westmacott.

Leading from the Library is the Queen's Room, the former "Best Bed Chamber". This panelled room was redecorated in 1841 for the visit of Queen Adelaide, widow of William IV, when its former function as a state bedroom was resurrected. It contains the great canopied Rococo-style bed in which the Queen slept, complete with the royal monogram "AR" (Adelaide Regina) embroidered on the bedhead. Other rooms on the second floor are mostly bedrooms, which include the Chinese Room (directly above the Tyrconnel Room) with its original hand-painted 18th-century Chinese wallpaper, the Yellow Room (directly above the Blue Room), and the Windsor Bedroom (directly above the School Room), so-called following its use by Edward VIII during the 1936 abdication crisis. Today, Belton has a permanent exhibition devoted to that event. Another royal visitor, the future Charles III, also used the room frequently while a cadet at nearby RAF Cranwell.

== Gardens and park ==
In 1690, Sir John Brownlow was granted permission to enclose an area of 1,000 acres (400 ha; 4.0 km^{2}) to transform into a park, with a grant to keep deer. There is evidence to suggest that some of this area had been a park since at least 1580. The park was laid out with avenues, including the still surviving Eastern Avenue which led east from the house. Brownlow also had a large pond or lake dug and planted 21,400 ash trees, 9,500 oak trees, and 614 fruit trees. It is thought that William Winde may have advised on the layout of the gardens. Closer to the house were a series of more formal gardens, including canal ponds bordered by plantations containing symmetrical walks resembling the "rond-points" (circular clearings in a garden from which straight paths radiate) introduced by the landscape gardener André Le Nôtre. By the end of the eighteenth century, these formal parterres had been removed and the canal ponds filled in. Lord Tyrconnel was responsible for many of the architectural features which survive in the park and garden. Between 1742 and 1751, a series of follies, including a Gothic ruin, a cascade, and a prospect or belvedere known as the Bellmount Tower, were constructed for him. When built the tower had two small wings flanking each side, since removed.

The 1st Earl Brownlow had Jeffry Wyatville turn his attention from the house to the park and Wyatville created the Italian Garden, embellished with the Orangery and, following its re-siting, the Lion Exedra. In 1838 Brownlow commissioned Anthony Salvin to undertake improvements to the estate in 1838. Salvin's additions included a public house, estate cottages, a hermitage and the boathouse. The gardens and park at Belton are listed at Grade I on Historic England's Register of Historic Parks and Gardens.

The owners of Belton are buried in the village of Belton, in the parish church of St Peter and St Paul. The church stands close to the house. The Brownlow tombs are collectively one of the most complete sets of family memorials in England—continuous generation to generation for almost 350 years. (Note: Pevsner describes the, "badly over-restored", church as "brimfull of Brownlow and Cust monuments".)

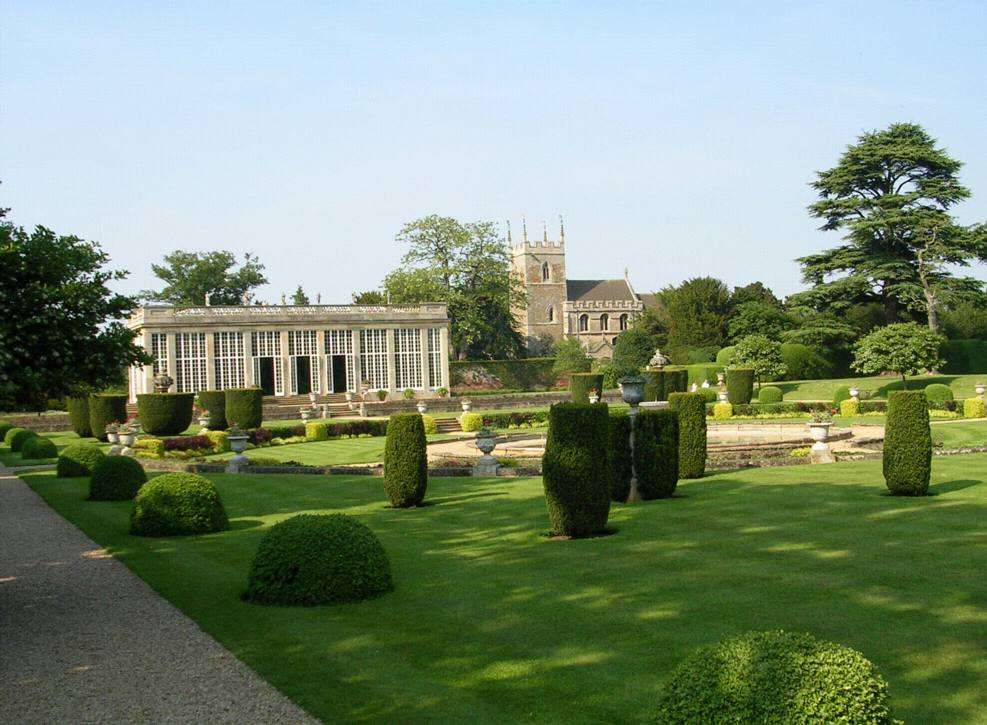
The "Italian garden", Orangery and Church. The Orangery and "Italian garden" were designed by Jeffry Wyatville in the early 19th century

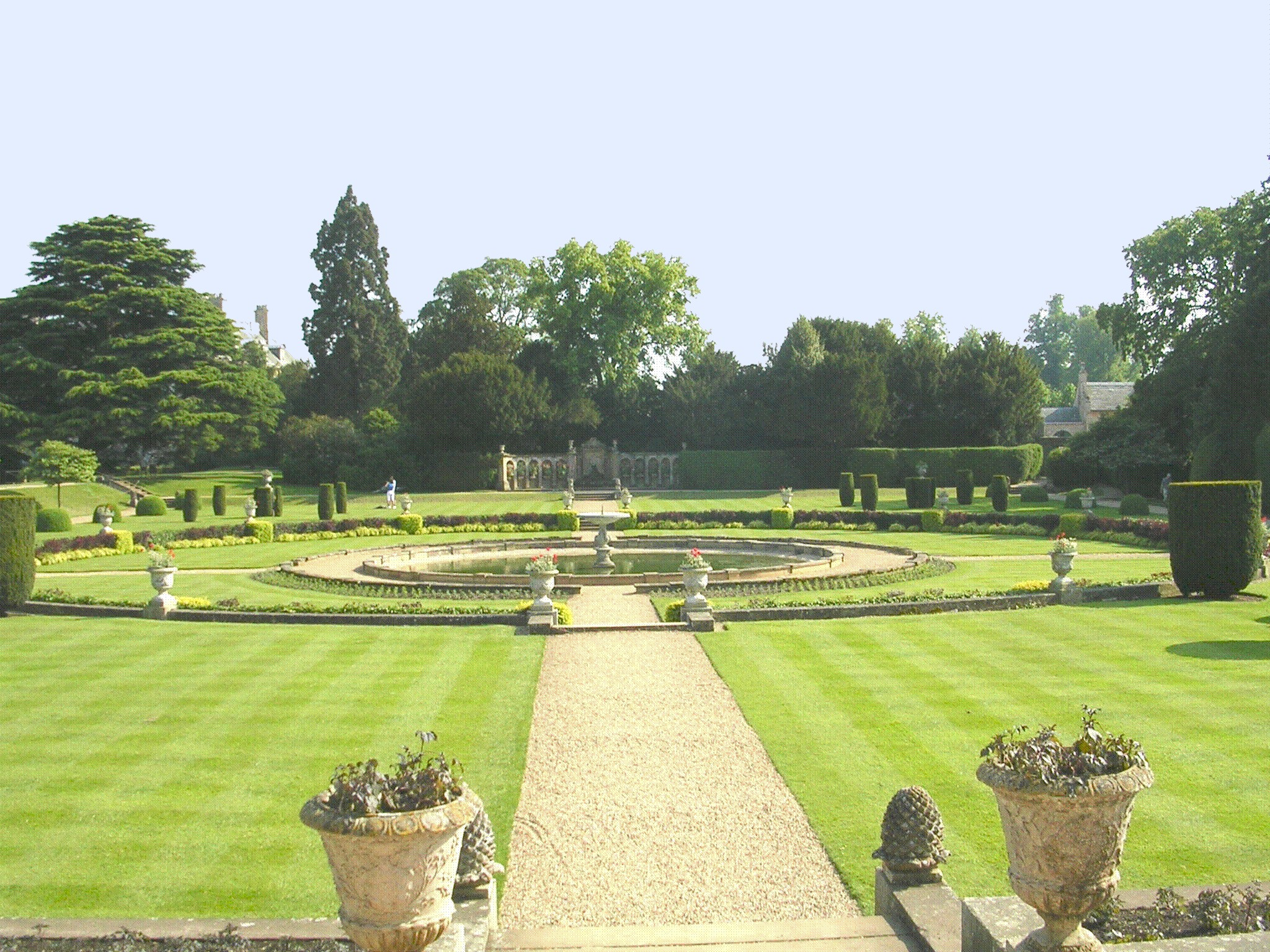
The Italian garden from the Orangery looking towards the "Lion Exedra"

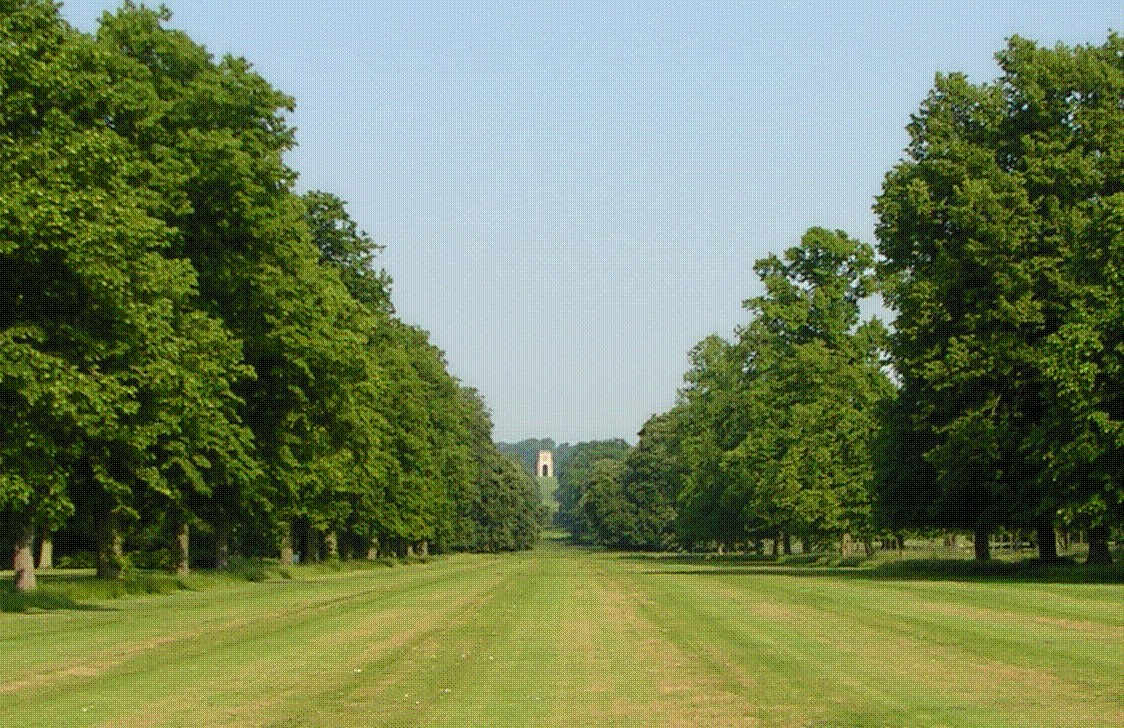
Looking from the east front of the house, along the Eastern Avenue, through the park towards Viscount Tyrconnel's Bellmount Tower, a belvedere built c. 1750

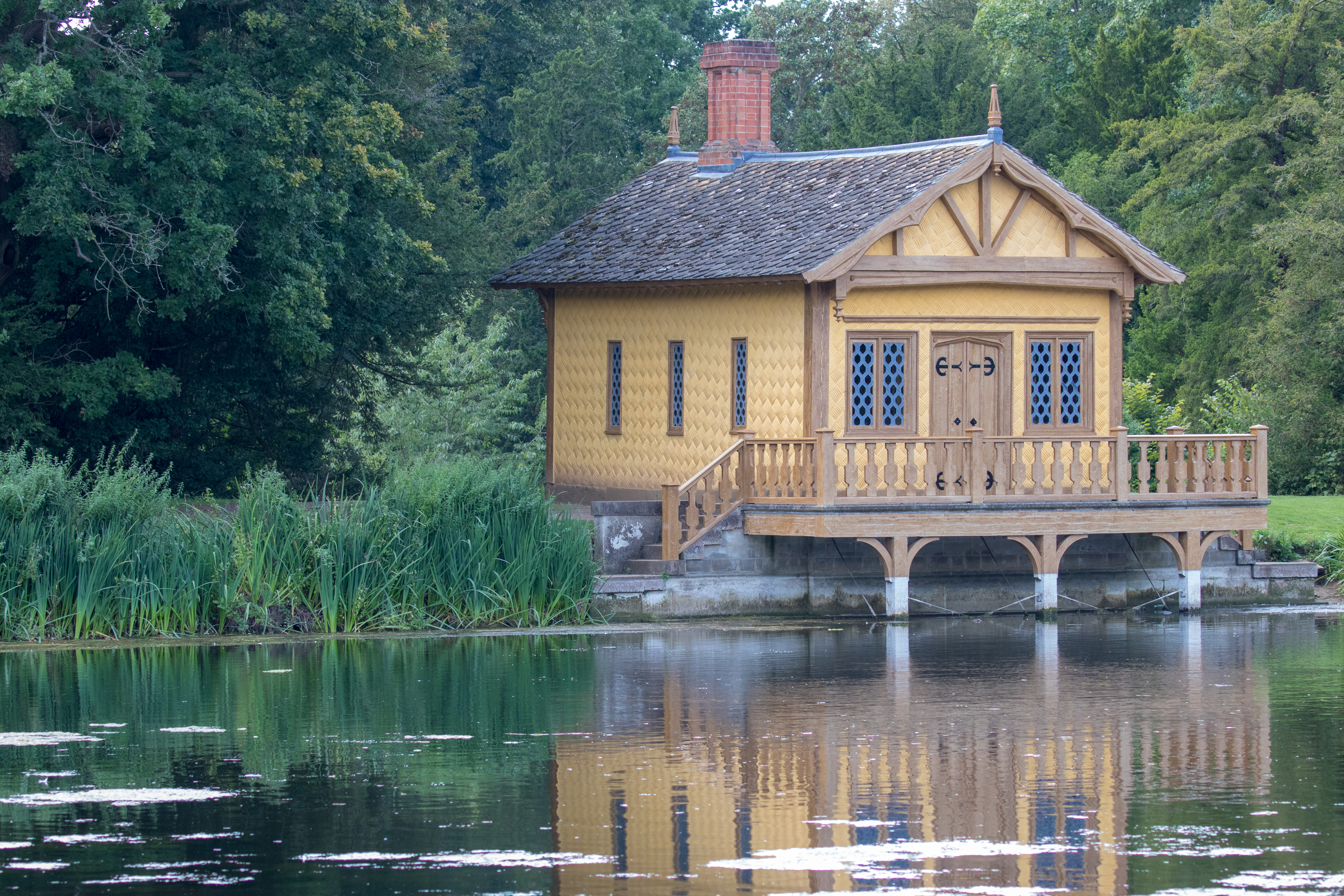
Anthony Salvin's boathouse

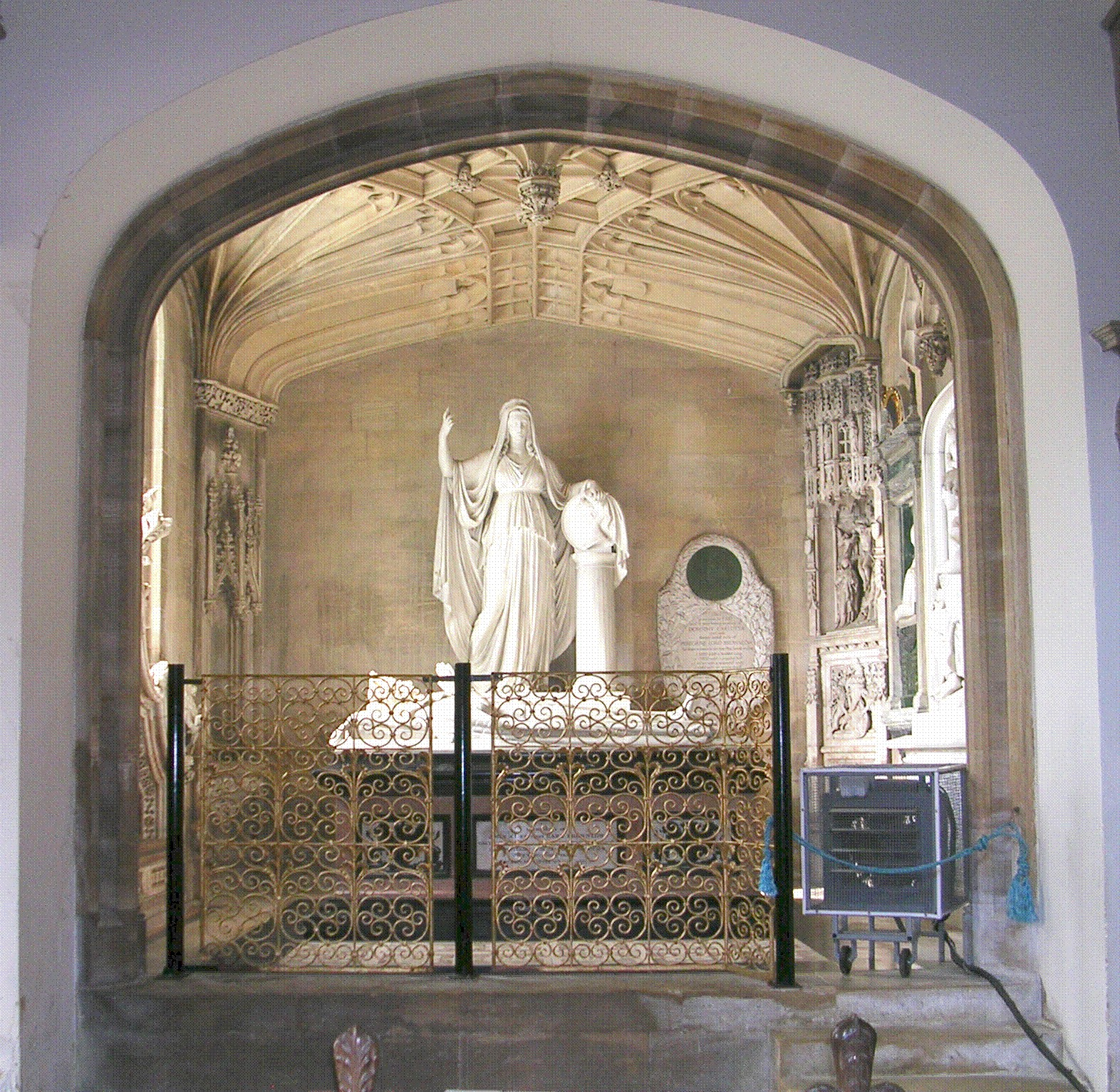
The funerary chapel of the owners of Belton House, in the Church of St Peter and St Paul adjacent to the mansion's garden

=== Listing designations ===
The estate at Belton has a number of listed buildings. The house itself is listed at Grade I, as are the stables, while the screen to the West Courtyard, the West Wing, and the brewhouse are listed at Grade II*. To the northwest of the house, the Italian Garden has a number of listed structures including; the Orangery at Grade II* and steps and matching pairs of urns to the north, and south, the fountain, the terrace wall and the Lion exedra, all at Grade II. To the north of the house, on the terrace are two pairs of statues, and urns, eight further urns on the main garden axis, two cisterns in the Dutch garden, and a statue, all listed Grade II, while the culminating sundial is listed at Grade II*.

The Belton Park Wilderness includes a number of listed features; its entrance gates are listed at Grade II*, while a boathouse, a Gothic folly, and a pumphouse are listed at Grade II. Listed features within the park include; the Bellmount Tower, and a temple, both listed at Grade II*, a cascade at Boating House Lake, Anthony Salvin's boathouse, a ha-ha, an icehouse, a wellhead and a conduit and memorials to John Egerton, Viscount Alford, and some Brownlow family dogs, all at Grade II. Listed features at the perimeter of the park, all listed at Grade II except the South Lodge Gates, include the North Lodge and its adjacent screens, and walls, the South Lodge and its Grade I listed gates, and four boundary walls.

== Sources ==
- Allibone, Jill (1989). Anthony Salvin: Pioneer of Gothic Revival Architecture. The Lutterworth Press. ISBN 0-7188-2707-4.
- Brundin, Abigail; Roberts, Dunstan (March 2015). "Book-Buying and the Grand Tour: the Italian Books at Belton House in Lincolnshire". The Library. 16 (1): 51–79. doi:10.1093/library/16.1.51.
- Colvin, Howard (1978). A Biographical Dictionary of British Architects: 1600-1840. John Murray. ISBN 9780300072075.
- Curl, James Stevens (2016). Oxford Dictionary of Architecture. Oxford University Press. ISBN 978-0-199-67499-2.
- Girouard, Mark (1978). Life in the English Country House. Yale University Press. ISBN 0-300-02273-5.
- Greaves, Simon (2014). The Country House at War: Fighting the Great War at Home and In The Trenches. National Trust Books. ISBN 978-1-907-89277-6.
- Gomme, Andor; Maguire, Alison (2008). Design and Plan in the Country House: From Castle Donjons to Palladian Boxes. Yale University Press. ISBN 9780300126457.
- Greeves, Lydia (2008). Houses of the National Trust. National Trust Books. ISBN 978-1-905-40066-9.
- Hancock, Terry N. (1985). Bomber County 2. Lincolnshire Recreational Services. ISBN 0-86111-122-2.
- Huxtable, Sally-Anne (2020). Sally-Anne Huxtable; Corrine Fowler; Cristo Kefalas; Emma Slocombe (eds.). Interim Report on the Connections between Colonialism and Properties now in the Care of the National Trust, including links with Historic Slavery (PDF). National Trust. OCLC 1266189564.
- Jackson-Stops, Gervase (1990). The Country House in Perspective. Pavilion Books Ltd. ISBN 0-8021-1228-5.
- Jenkins, Simon (2003). England's Thousand Best Houses. Penguin Books. ISBN 978-0-713-99596-1.
- Marsden, Jonathan (1985). Belton House, Lincolnshire. The National Trust.
- Musson, Jeremy (2005). How to Read a Country House. Ebury Press. ISBN 978-0-091-90076-2.
- Nicolson, Nigel (1965). Great Houses of Britain. Weidenfeld & Nicolson. ISBN 0-600-01651-X.
- Oliver, Kingsley M. (2002). The RAF Regiment at War 1942–1946. Leo Cooper. ISBN 0-85052-852-6.
- Pevsner, Nikolaus; Harris, John; Antram, Nicholas (1989). Lincolnshire. The Buildings of England. New Haven, US and London: Yale University Press. ISBN 0-300-09620-8.
- Purcell, Mark (2019). The Country House Library. Yale University Press. ISBN 978-0-300-24868-5.
- Robinson, John Martin (2011). Felling the Ancient Oaks: How England Lost its Great Country Estates. Aurum Press Ltd. ISBN 978-1-845-13670-3.
- Thornton, Michael (1986). Royal Feud. Michael Joseph Ltd. ISBN 0-330-29505-5.
- Tinniswood, Adrian (1992). Belton House. The National Trust. ISBN 0-7078-0113-3.
- — (2006). Belton House. The National Trust. ISBN 1-84359-218-5.
