= Belton, South Kesteven =

Village in Lincolnshire, England

Coordinates: 52.946298°N 0.616614°W

Belton
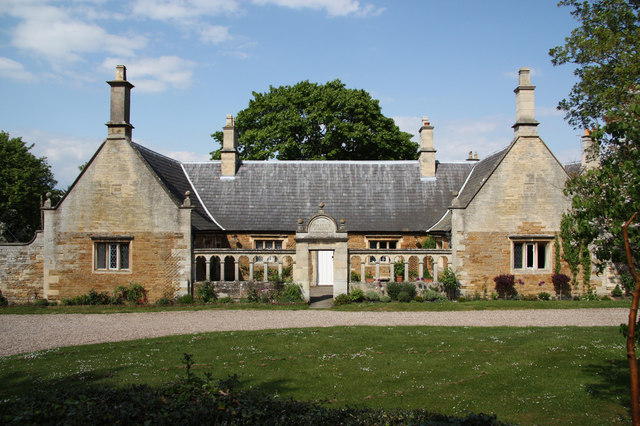
- Medieval Almshouse in Belton

- Location within Lincolnshire
- OS grid reference: SK930396
  - London: 100 mi (160 km) S
- Civil parish: Belton and Manthorpe
- District: South Kesteven
- Shire county: Lincolnshire
- Region: East Midlands
- Country: England
- Sovereign state: United Kingdom
- Post town: Grantham
- Postcode district: NG32
- Dialling code: 01476
- Police: Lincolnshire
- Fire: Lincolnshire
- Ambulance: East Midlands
- UK Parliament: Grantham and Stamford

Belton is a village in the civil parish of Belton and Manthorpe, in the South Kesteven district of Lincolnshire, England. It is situated on the A607 road, and 3 miles (5 km) north from the market town of Grantham. In 1921 the parish had a population of 145.

== History ==
The village is part of the ecclesiastical parish of Belton. The church is dedicated to St Peter and St Paul and is part of the Loveden Deanery of the Diocese of Lincoln. The 2014 incumbent is Rev Stuart Hadley. A church at Belton is recorded in the Domesday Book. The present church is significant for its Norman, late Medieval, Georgian and Victorian alterations and additions.

In May 1643 Parliamentary cavalry, under the leadership of Oliver Cromwell, clashed with Royalist forces at the south of Belton Park, to the east of Manthorpe. The Belton church register records "May 1643, buried three unknown soldiers, slain in Belton fight". On 1 April 1931 the civil parish was abolished to form "Belton and Manthorpe".

== Geography ==
The A607 bypass started construction in April 1971, being 1,000 yards long. The bypass opened on Tuesday 9 November 1971.

== Community ==
The village is primarily an estate village, centred on Belton House. The house is the property of the National Trust and is open to the public. Belton has thirty-one predominantly stone-built houses, most standing within a defined Conservation Area, with a further twelve homes outlying the village centre. A number of structures and buildings in the village are listed, with many being designed by Anthony Salvin, a notable Victorian architect who also worked at Belton House. Examples of Salvin's work include: the former post office and smithy; the former school (now a house and studio); the village cross; No. 2 Main Street; the Greyhound Lodge; and Dial Cottage.

== Transport ==
Belton is bypassed by the A607, a road which links Grantham to the south, and Lincoln to the north along which runs a Stagecoach Group bus service.

== Gallery ==
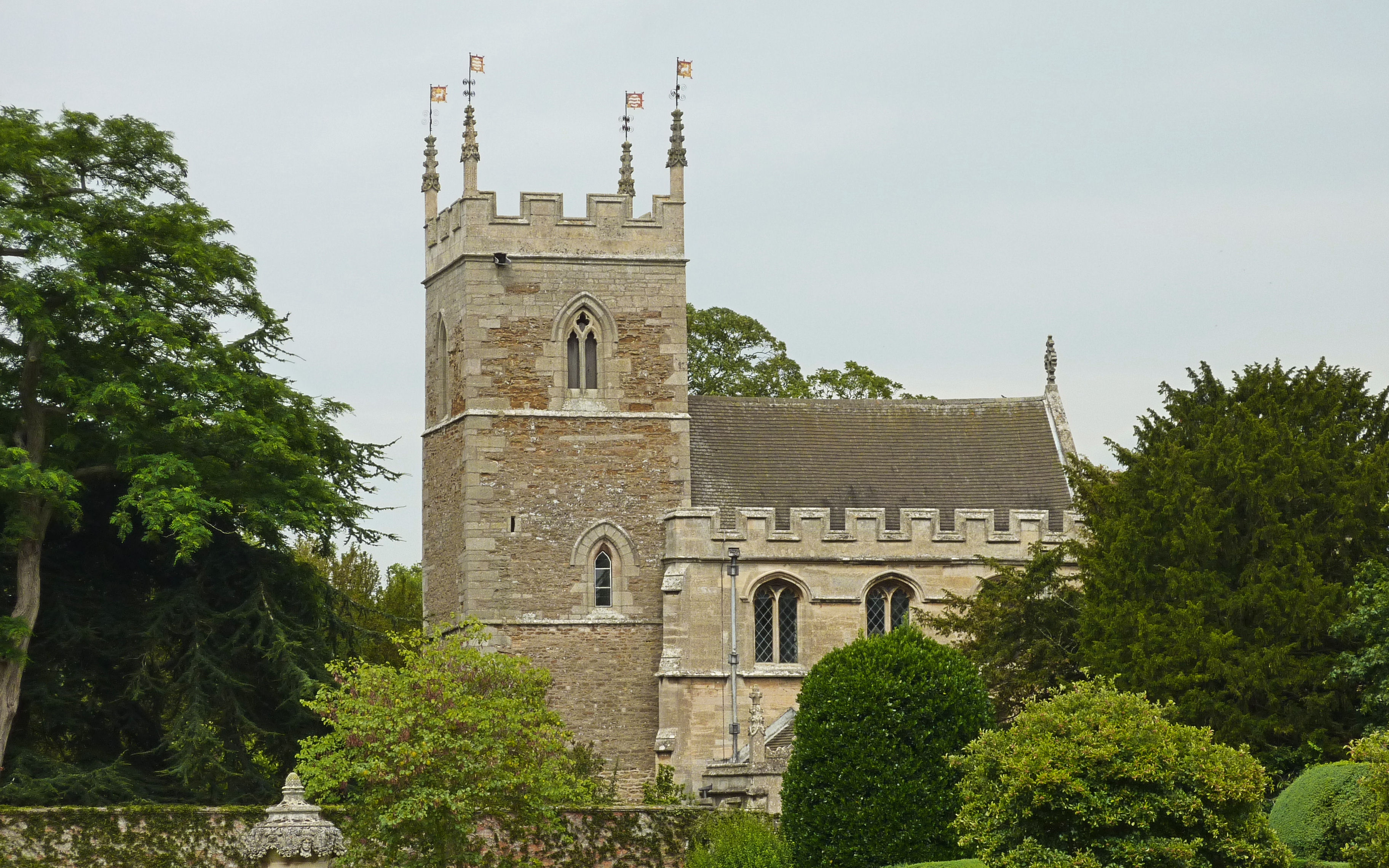
Church of St Peter and St Paul from Belton Park

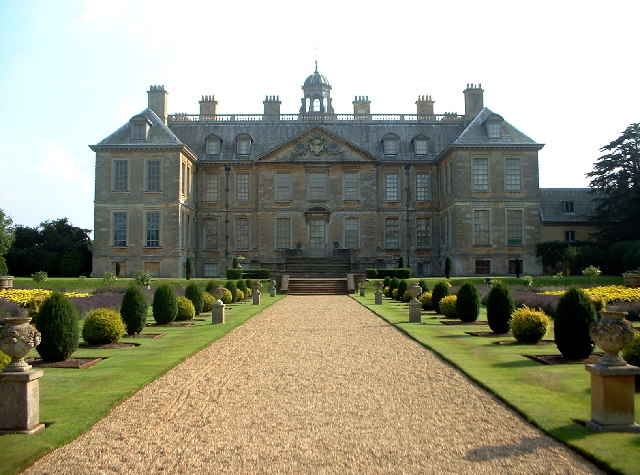
Belton House
